

221001–221100 

|-bgcolor=#fefefe
| 221001 ||  || — || July 12, 2005 || Bergisch Gladbach || W. Bickel || — || align=right | 1.3 km || 
|-id=002 bgcolor=#fefefe
| 221002 ||  || — || July 5, 2005 || Mount Lemmon || Mount Lemmon Survey || NYS || align=right data-sort-value="0.96" | 960 m || 
|-id=003 bgcolor=#fefefe
| 221003 ||  || — || July 5, 2005 || Palomar || NEAT || V || align=right data-sort-value="0.97" | 970 m || 
|-id=004 bgcolor=#fefefe
| 221004 ||  || — || July 7, 2005 || Kitt Peak || Spacewatch || NYS || align=right data-sort-value="0.85" | 850 m || 
|-id=005 bgcolor=#fefefe
| 221005 ||  || — || July 5, 2005 || Mount Lemmon || Mount Lemmon Survey || MAS || align=right data-sort-value="0.92" | 920 m || 
|-id=006 bgcolor=#fefefe
| 221006 ||  || — || July 27, 2005 || Reedy Creek || J. Broughton || — || align=right | 1.6 km || 
|-id=007 bgcolor=#fefefe
| 221007 ||  || — || July 27, 2005 || Palomar || NEAT || — || align=right data-sort-value="0.91" | 910 m || 
|-id=008 bgcolor=#fefefe
| 221008 ||  || — || July 28, 2005 || Palomar || NEAT || — || align=right | 1.1 km || 
|-id=009 bgcolor=#fefefe
| 221009 ||  || — || July 27, 2005 || Palomar || NEAT || ERI || align=right | 2.5 km || 
|-id=010 bgcolor=#fefefe
| 221010 ||  || — || July 29, 2005 || Palomar || NEAT || NYS || align=right data-sort-value="0.97" | 970 m || 
|-id=011 bgcolor=#fefefe
| 221011 ||  || — || July 29, 2005 || Palomar || NEAT || — || align=right | 1.6 km || 
|-id=012 bgcolor=#fefefe
| 221012 ||  || — || July 30, 2005 || Palomar || NEAT || V || align=right data-sort-value="0.99" | 990 m || 
|-id=013 bgcolor=#E9E9E9
| 221013 ||  || — || July 30, 2005 || Palomar || NEAT || — || align=right | 1.0 km || 
|-id=014 bgcolor=#fefefe
| 221014 ||  || — || July 30, 2005 || Palomar || NEAT || — || align=right | 1.3 km || 
|-id=015 bgcolor=#fefefe
| 221015 ||  || — || August 1, 2005 || Siding Spring || SSS || — || align=right | 1.3 km || 
|-id=016 bgcolor=#fefefe
| 221016 ||  || — || August 1, 2005 || Siding Spring || SSS || V || align=right | 1.3 km || 
|-id=017 bgcolor=#fefefe
| 221017 ||  || — || August 4, 2005 || Palomar || NEAT || — || align=right | 1.2 km || 
|-id=018 bgcolor=#fefefe
| 221018 ||  || — || August 4, 2005 || Palomar || NEAT || NYS || align=right | 1.0 km || 
|-id=019 bgcolor=#fefefe
| 221019 Raine ||  ||  || August 13, 2005 || Wrightwood || J. W. Young || MAS || align=right data-sort-value="0.87" | 870 m || 
|-id=020 bgcolor=#fefefe
| 221020 ||  || — || August 15, 2005 || Siding Spring || SSS || — || align=right | 1.4 km || 
|-id=021 bgcolor=#fefefe
| 221021 ||  || — || August 24, 2005 || Palomar || NEAT || MAS || align=right | 1.3 km || 
|-id=022 bgcolor=#fefefe
| 221022 ||  || — || August 22, 2005 || Palomar || NEAT || — || align=right | 1.1 km || 
|-id=023 bgcolor=#fefefe
| 221023 ||  || — || August 25, 2005 || Campo Imperatore || CINEOS || V || align=right | 1.1 km || 
|-id=024 bgcolor=#fefefe
| 221024 ||  || — || August 25, 2005 || Campo imperatore || CINEOS || — || align=right | 1.3 km || 
|-id=025 bgcolor=#fefefe
| 221025 ||  || — || August 26, 2005 || Anderson Mesa || LONEOS || V || align=right | 1.2 km || 
|-id=026 bgcolor=#fefefe
| 221026 Jeancoester ||  ||  || August 28, 2005 || Saint-Sulpice || B. Christophe || — || align=right | 1.4 km || 
|-id=027 bgcolor=#fefefe
| 221027 ||  || — || August 24, 2005 || Palomar || NEAT || V || align=right data-sort-value="0.99" | 990 m || 
|-id=028 bgcolor=#fefefe
| 221028 ||  || — || August 25, 2005 || Palomar || NEAT || NYS || align=right | 1.0 km || 
|-id=029 bgcolor=#fefefe
| 221029 ||  || — || August 25, 2005 || Palomar || NEAT || — || align=right | 2.2 km || 
|-id=030 bgcolor=#fefefe
| 221030 ||  || — || August 26, 2005 || Anderson Mesa || LONEOS || V || align=right data-sort-value="0.86" | 860 m || 
|-id=031 bgcolor=#fefefe
| 221031 ||  || — || August 26, 2005 || Anderson Mesa || LONEOS || NYS || align=right data-sort-value="0.93" | 930 m || 
|-id=032 bgcolor=#E9E9E9
| 221032 ||  || — || August 26, 2005 || Palomar || NEAT || — || align=right | 1.6 km || 
|-id=033 bgcolor=#fefefe
| 221033 ||  || — || August 27, 2005 || Siding Spring || SSS || MAS || align=right | 1.2 km || 
|-id=034 bgcolor=#fefefe
| 221034 ||  || — || August 27, 2005 || Anderson Mesa || LONEOS || — || align=right | 1.4 km || 
|-id=035 bgcolor=#fefefe
| 221035 ||  || — || August 27, 2005 || Anderson Mesa || LONEOS || — || align=right | 1.5 km || 
|-id=036 bgcolor=#fefefe
| 221036 ||  || — || August 27, 2005 || Anderson Mesa || LONEOS || — || align=right | 1.0 km || 
|-id=037 bgcolor=#fefefe
| 221037 ||  || — || August 27, 2005 || Haleakala || NEAT || — || align=right | 1.8 km || 
|-id=038 bgcolor=#fefefe
| 221038 ||  || — || August 28, 2005 || Siding Spring || SSS || V || align=right | 1.0 km || 
|-id=039 bgcolor=#fefefe
| 221039 ||  || — || August 28, 2005 || Siding Spring || SSS || V || align=right | 1.1 km || 
|-id=040 bgcolor=#E9E9E9
| 221040 ||  || — || August 29, 2005 || Socorro || LINEAR || — || align=right | 1.8 km || 
|-id=041 bgcolor=#fefefe
| 221041 ||  || — || August 29, 2005 || Anderson Mesa || LONEOS || FLO || align=right | 1.3 km || 
|-id=042 bgcolor=#fefefe
| 221042 ||  || — || August 24, 2005 || Palomar || NEAT || V || align=right | 1.2 km || 
|-id=043 bgcolor=#fefefe
| 221043 ||  || — || August 29, 2005 || Anderson Mesa || LONEOS || NYS || align=right | 1.1 km || 
|-id=044 bgcolor=#fefefe
| 221044 ||  || — || August 29, 2005 || Saint-Véran || Saint-Véran Obs. || MAS || align=right | 1.2 km || 
|-id=045 bgcolor=#fefefe
| 221045 ||  || — || August 27, 2005 || Palomar || NEAT || — || align=right | 1.2 km || 
|-id=046 bgcolor=#fefefe
| 221046 ||  || — || August 27, 2005 || Palomar || NEAT || — || align=right | 1.7 km || 
|-id=047 bgcolor=#fefefe
| 221047 ||  || — || August 27, 2005 || Palomar || NEAT || — || align=right | 1.2 km || 
|-id=048 bgcolor=#fefefe
| 221048 ||  || — || August 27, 2005 || Palomar || NEAT || — || align=right | 1.0 km || 
|-id=049 bgcolor=#fefefe
| 221049 ||  || — || August 27, 2005 || Palomar || NEAT || MAS || align=right | 1.0 km || 
|-id=050 bgcolor=#E9E9E9
| 221050 ||  || — || August 27, 2005 || Palomar || NEAT || — || align=right | 2.0 km || 
|-id=051 bgcolor=#E9E9E9
| 221051 ||  || — || August 27, 2005 || Palomar || NEAT || — || align=right | 1.7 km || 
|-id=052 bgcolor=#E9E9E9
| 221052 ||  || — || August 27, 2005 || Palomar || NEAT || HNS || align=right | 1.9 km || 
|-id=053 bgcolor=#fefefe
| 221053 ||  || — || August 28, 2005 || Kitt Peak || Spacewatch || — || align=right | 1.2 km || 
|-id=054 bgcolor=#fefefe
| 221054 ||  || — || August 28, 2005 || Kitt Peak || Spacewatch || — || align=right | 1.2 km || 
|-id=055 bgcolor=#E9E9E9
| 221055 ||  || — || August 28, 2005 || Kitt Peak || Spacewatch || — || align=right | 1.4 km || 
|-id=056 bgcolor=#fefefe
| 221056 ||  || — || August 28, 2005 || Kitt Peak || Spacewatch || — || align=right | 1.7 km || 
|-id=057 bgcolor=#E9E9E9
| 221057 ||  || — || August 28, 2005 || Kitt Peak || Spacewatch || — || align=right | 1.1 km || 
|-id=058 bgcolor=#fefefe
| 221058 ||  || — || August 31, 2005 || Anderson Mesa || LONEOS || — || align=right | 2.8 km || 
|-id=059 bgcolor=#E9E9E9
| 221059 ||  || — || August 31, 2005 || Anderson Mesa || LONEOS || — || align=right | 1.8 km || 
|-id=060 bgcolor=#fefefe
| 221060 ||  || — || August 31, 2005 || Kitt Peak || Spacewatch || — || align=right | 1.3 km || 
|-id=061 bgcolor=#fefefe
| 221061 ||  || — || August 28, 2005 || Siding Spring || SSS || — || align=right | 1.2 km || 
|-id=062 bgcolor=#E9E9E9
| 221062 ||  || — || August 28, 2005 || Kitt Peak || Spacewatch || — || align=right | 2.3 km || 
|-id=063 bgcolor=#fefefe
| 221063 ||  || — || August 28, 2005 || Siding Spring || SSS || — || align=right | 1.6 km || 
|-id=064 bgcolor=#E9E9E9
| 221064 ||  || — || August 25, 2005 || Palomar || NEAT || — || align=right | 1.6 km || 
|-id=065 bgcolor=#E9E9E9
| 221065 ||  || — || August 31, 2005 || Palomar || NEAT || — || align=right | 1.1 km || 
|-id=066 bgcolor=#fefefe
| 221066 ||  || — || September 1, 2005 || Kitt Peak || Spacewatch || NYS || align=right data-sort-value="0.84" | 840 m || 
|-id=067 bgcolor=#E9E9E9
| 221067 ||  || — || September 1, 2005 || Palomar || NEAT || MAR || align=right | 1.6 km || 
|-id=068 bgcolor=#E9E9E9
| 221068 ||  || — || September 11, 2005 || Anderson Mesa || LONEOS || EUN || align=right | 2.0 km || 
|-id=069 bgcolor=#fefefe
| 221069 ||  || — || September 9, 2005 || Socorro || LINEAR || — || align=right | 1.7 km || 
|-id=070 bgcolor=#E9E9E9
| 221070 ||  || — || September 13, 2005 || Catalina || CSS || JUN || align=right | 1.6 km || 
|-id=071 bgcolor=#fefefe
| 221071 ||  || — || September 12, 2005 || Kitt Peak || Spacewatch || — || align=right | 1.2 km || 
|-id=072 bgcolor=#E9E9E9
| 221072 || 2005 SN || — || September 22, 2005 || Uccle || T. Pauwels || — || align=right | 1.8 km || 
|-id=073 bgcolor=#fefefe
| 221073 Ovruch ||  ||  || September 23, 2005 || Andrushivka || Andrushivka Obs. || — || align=right | 1.4 km || 
|-id=074 bgcolor=#E9E9E9
| 221074 ||  || — || September 23, 2005 || Kitt Peak || Spacewatch || WIT || align=right | 1.6 km || 
|-id=075 bgcolor=#d6d6d6
| 221075 ||  || — || September 24, 2005 || Kitt Peak || Spacewatch || — || align=right | 4.0 km || 
|-id=076 bgcolor=#fefefe
| 221076 ||  || — || September 25, 2005 || Catalina || CSS || — || align=right | 1.5 km || 
|-id=077 bgcolor=#E9E9E9
| 221077 ||  || — || September 24, 2005 || Kitt Peak || Spacewatch || — || align=right | 1.9 km || 
|-id=078 bgcolor=#fefefe
| 221078 ||  || — || September 24, 2005 || Anderson Mesa || LONEOS || — || align=right | 3.2 km || 
|-id=079 bgcolor=#E9E9E9
| 221079 ||  || — || September 23, 2005 || Kitt Peak || Spacewatch || — || align=right | 1.7 km || 
|-id=080 bgcolor=#E9E9E9
| 221080 ||  || — || September 24, 2005 || Kitt Peak || Spacewatch || — || align=right | 1.6 km || 
|-id=081 bgcolor=#E9E9E9
| 221081 ||  || — || September 24, 2005 || Kitt Peak || Spacewatch || — || align=right | 2.1 km || 
|-id=082 bgcolor=#E9E9E9
| 221082 ||  || — || September 24, 2005 || Kitt Peak || Spacewatch || PAD || align=right | 2.3 km || 
|-id=083 bgcolor=#E9E9E9
| 221083 ||  || — || September 24, 2005 || Kitt Peak || Spacewatch || EUN || align=right | 1.7 km || 
|-id=084 bgcolor=#E9E9E9
| 221084 ||  || — || September 24, 2005 || Kitt Peak || Spacewatch || — || align=right | 1.7 km || 
|-id=085 bgcolor=#E9E9E9
| 221085 ||  || — || September 24, 2005 || Kitt Peak || Spacewatch || JUN || align=right | 1.5 km || 
|-id=086 bgcolor=#E9E9E9
| 221086 ||  || — || September 25, 2005 || Kitt Peak || Spacewatch || — || align=right | 1.3 km || 
|-id=087 bgcolor=#E9E9E9
| 221087 ||  || — || September 26, 2005 || Kitt Peak || Spacewatch || — || align=right | 2.4 km || 
|-id=088 bgcolor=#E9E9E9
| 221088 ||  || — || September 26, 2005 || Catalina || CSS || — || align=right | 3.1 km || 
|-id=089 bgcolor=#E9E9E9
| 221089 ||  || — || September 27, 2005 || Kitt Peak || Spacewatch || EUN || align=right | 1.5 km || 
|-id=090 bgcolor=#E9E9E9
| 221090 ||  || — || September 24, 2005 || Kitt Peak || Spacewatch || — || align=right | 1.3 km || 
|-id=091 bgcolor=#E9E9E9
| 221091 ||  || — || September 24, 2005 || Kitt Peak || Spacewatch || — || align=right | 1.1 km || 
|-id=092 bgcolor=#E9E9E9
| 221092 ||  || — || September 24, 2005 || Kitt Peak || Spacewatch || MIS || align=right | 2.9 km || 
|-id=093 bgcolor=#E9E9E9
| 221093 ||  || — || September 24, 2005 || Kitt Peak || Spacewatch || HEN || align=right | 1.4 km || 
|-id=094 bgcolor=#fefefe
| 221094 ||  || — || September 25, 2005 || Palomar || NEAT || — || align=right | 2.7 km || 
|-id=095 bgcolor=#E9E9E9
| 221095 ||  || — || September 25, 2005 || Kitt Peak || Spacewatch || — || align=right | 1.1 km || 
|-id=096 bgcolor=#E9E9E9
| 221096 ||  || — || September 25, 2005 || Kitt Peak || Spacewatch || — || align=right | 1.1 km || 
|-id=097 bgcolor=#E9E9E9
| 221097 ||  || — || September 25, 2005 || Kitt Peak || Spacewatch || — || align=right | 1.4 km || 
|-id=098 bgcolor=#E9E9E9
| 221098 ||  || — || September 25, 2005 || Catalina || CSS || — || align=right | 1.4 km || 
|-id=099 bgcolor=#E9E9E9
| 221099 ||  || — || September 25, 2005 || Kitt Peak || Spacewatch || — || align=right | 1.7 km || 
|-id=100 bgcolor=#E9E9E9
| 221100 ||  || — || September 25, 2005 || Kitt Peak || Spacewatch || EUN || align=right | 1.4 km || 
|}

221101–221200 

|-bgcolor=#E9E9E9
| 221101 ||  || — || September 26, 2005 || Kitt Peak || Spacewatch || — || align=right | 1.7 km || 
|-id=102 bgcolor=#E9E9E9
| 221102 ||  || — || September 26, 2005 || Kitt Peak || Spacewatch || — || align=right | 1.4 km || 
|-id=103 bgcolor=#E9E9E9
| 221103 ||  || — || September 26, 2005 || Kitt Peak || Spacewatch || — || align=right | 2.5 km || 
|-id=104 bgcolor=#fefefe
| 221104 ||  || — || September 29, 2005 || Palomar || NEAT || MAS || align=right | 1.0 km || 
|-id=105 bgcolor=#E9E9E9
| 221105 ||  || — || September 25, 2005 || Kitt Peak || Spacewatch || — || align=right | 2.8 km || 
|-id=106 bgcolor=#E9E9E9
| 221106 ||  || — || September 25, 2005 || Kitt Peak || Spacewatch || — || align=right data-sort-value="0.91" | 910 m || 
|-id=107 bgcolor=#E9E9E9
| 221107 ||  || — || September 25, 2005 || Kitt Peak || Spacewatch || HEN || align=right | 1.2 km || 
|-id=108 bgcolor=#E9E9E9
| 221108 ||  || — || September 25, 2005 || Palomar || NEAT || MAR || align=right | 1.9 km || 
|-id=109 bgcolor=#fefefe
| 221109 ||  || — || September 27, 2005 || Kitt Peak || Spacewatch || MAS || align=right data-sort-value="0.80" | 800 m || 
|-id=110 bgcolor=#fefefe
| 221110 ||  || — || September 27, 2005 || Socorro || LINEAR || V || align=right | 1.1 km || 
|-id=111 bgcolor=#fefefe
| 221111 ||  || — || September 28, 2005 || Palomar || NEAT || — || align=right | 1.4 km || 
|-id=112 bgcolor=#E9E9E9
| 221112 ||  || — || September 29, 2005 || Kitt Peak || Spacewatch || EUN || align=right | 1.6 km || 
|-id=113 bgcolor=#E9E9E9
| 221113 ||  || — || September 29, 2005 || Kitt Peak || Spacewatch || — || align=right | 1.6 km || 
|-id=114 bgcolor=#E9E9E9
| 221114 ||  || — || September 29, 2005 || Mount Lemmon || Mount Lemmon Survey || — || align=right | 1.7 km || 
|-id=115 bgcolor=#E9E9E9
| 221115 ||  || — || September 29, 2005 || Kitt Peak || Spacewatch || — || align=right | 2.7 km || 
|-id=116 bgcolor=#fefefe
| 221116 ||  || — || September 30, 2005 || Mount Lemmon || Mount Lemmon Survey || — || align=right | 1.3 km || 
|-id=117 bgcolor=#E9E9E9
| 221117 ||  || — || September 30, 2005 || Mount Lemmon || Mount Lemmon Survey || MIT || align=right | 2.0 km || 
|-id=118 bgcolor=#E9E9E9
| 221118 ||  || — || September 30, 2005 || Palomar || NEAT || — || align=right | 3.7 km || 
|-id=119 bgcolor=#fefefe
| 221119 ||  || — || September 30, 2005 || Siding Spring || SSS || — || align=right | 2.3 km || 
|-id=120 bgcolor=#E9E9E9
| 221120 ||  || — || September 30, 2005 || Mount Lemmon || Mount Lemmon Survey || — || align=right | 2.3 km || 
|-id=121 bgcolor=#E9E9E9
| 221121 ||  || — || September 27, 2005 || Socorro || LINEAR || — || align=right | 2.0 km || 
|-id=122 bgcolor=#E9E9E9
| 221122 ||  || — || September 27, 2005 || Palomar || NEAT || EUN || align=right | 1.5 km || 
|-id=123 bgcolor=#E9E9E9
| 221123 ||  || — || September 29, 2005 || Siding Spring || SSS || MAR || align=right | 1.6 km || 
|-id=124 bgcolor=#E9E9E9
| 221124 ||  || — || September 29, 2005 || Mount Lemmon || Mount Lemmon Survey || — || align=right | 2.1 km || 
|-id=125 bgcolor=#E9E9E9
| 221125 ||  || — || September 30, 2005 || Mount Lemmon || Mount Lemmon Survey || — || align=right | 1.8 km || 
|-id=126 bgcolor=#E9E9E9
| 221126 ||  || — || September 30, 2005 || Mount Lemmon || Mount Lemmon Survey || — || align=right | 2.0 km || 
|-id=127 bgcolor=#E9E9E9
| 221127 ||  || — || September 29, 2005 || Kitt Peak || Spacewatch || ADE || align=right | 2.4 km || 
|-id=128 bgcolor=#fefefe
| 221128 ||  || — || September 23, 2005 || Palomar || NEAT || — || align=right | 1.3 km || 
|-id=129 bgcolor=#E9E9E9
| 221129 ||  || — || September 25, 2005 || Catalina || CSS || — || align=right | 2.4 km || 
|-id=130 bgcolor=#E9E9E9
| 221130 ||  || — || September 23, 2005 || Kitt Peak || Spacewatch || — || align=right | 1.8 km || 
|-id=131 bgcolor=#E9E9E9
| 221131 ||  || — || September 29, 2005 || Kitt Peak || Spacewatch || — || align=right | 4.0 km || 
|-id=132 bgcolor=#E9E9E9
| 221132 ||  || — || September 30, 2005 || Socorro || LINEAR || GER || align=right | 2.7 km || 
|-id=133 bgcolor=#E9E9E9
| 221133 ||  || — || September 30, 2005 || Mount Lemmon || Mount Lemmon Survey || — || align=right | 2.4 km || 
|-id=134 bgcolor=#E9E9E9
| 221134 ||  || — || September 24, 2005 || Kitt Peak || Spacewatch || — || align=right | 2.1 km || 
|-id=135 bgcolor=#E9E9E9
| 221135 ||  || — || September 29, 2005 || Catalina || CSS || — || align=right | 2.7 km || 
|-id=136 bgcolor=#E9E9E9
| 221136 ||  || — || September 23, 2005 || Kitt Peak || Spacewatch || — || align=right | 1.7 km || 
|-id=137 bgcolor=#E9E9E9
| 221137 ||  || — || September 21, 2005 || Apache Point || A. C. Becker || EUN || align=right | 1.4 km || 
|-id=138 bgcolor=#E9E9E9
| 221138 ||  || — || October 1, 2005 || Mount Lemmon || Mount Lemmon Survey || — || align=right | 2.9 km || 
|-id=139 bgcolor=#E9E9E9
| 221139 ||  || — || October 1, 2005 || Socorro || LINEAR || JUN || align=right | 1.5 km || 
|-id=140 bgcolor=#E9E9E9
| 221140 ||  || — || October 1, 2005 || Catalina || CSS || GEF || align=right | 1.7 km || 
|-id=141 bgcolor=#E9E9E9
| 221141 ||  || — || October 1, 2005 || Mount Lemmon || Mount Lemmon Survey || CLO || align=right | 2.8 km || 
|-id=142 bgcolor=#E9E9E9
| 221142 ||  || — || October 1, 2005 || Kitt Peak || Spacewatch || — || align=right | 1.7 km || 
|-id=143 bgcolor=#E9E9E9
| 221143 ||  || — || October 1, 2005 || Mount Lemmon || Mount Lemmon Survey || — || align=right data-sort-value="0.95" | 950 m || 
|-id=144 bgcolor=#E9E9E9
| 221144 ||  || — || October 1, 2005 || Mount Lemmon || Mount Lemmon Survey || MIS || align=right | 3.3 km || 
|-id=145 bgcolor=#E9E9E9
| 221145 ||  || — || October 1, 2005 || Kitt Peak || Spacewatch || — || align=right | 1.8 km || 
|-id=146 bgcolor=#E9E9E9
| 221146 ||  || — || October 1, 2005 || Mount Lemmon || Mount Lemmon Survey || — || align=right | 1.1 km || 
|-id=147 bgcolor=#E9E9E9
| 221147 ||  || — || October 1, 2005 || Kitt Peak || Spacewatch || — || align=right | 1.2 km || 
|-id=148 bgcolor=#E9E9E9
| 221148 ||  || — || October 2, 2005 || Kitt Peak || Spacewatch || — || align=right | 2.9 km || 
|-id=149 bgcolor=#E9E9E9
| 221149 Cindyfoote ||  ||  || October 3, 2005 || Catalina || CSS || — || align=right | 1.9 km || 
|-id=150 bgcolor=#E9E9E9
| 221150 Jerryfoote ||  ||  || October 3, 2005 || Catalina || CSS || — || align=right | 2.3 km || 
|-id=151 bgcolor=#E9E9E9
| 221151 ||  || — || October 4, 2005 || Mount Lemmon || Mount Lemmon Survey || — || align=right data-sort-value="0.97" | 970 m || 
|-id=152 bgcolor=#E9E9E9
| 221152 ||  || — || October 4, 2005 || Mount Lemmon || Mount Lemmon Survey || — || align=right | 2.9 km || 
|-id=153 bgcolor=#fefefe
| 221153 ||  || — || October 7, 2005 || Anderson Mesa || LONEOS || V || align=right data-sort-value="0.90" | 900 m || 
|-id=154 bgcolor=#E9E9E9
| 221154 ||  || — || October 4, 2005 || Palomar || NEAT || — || align=right | 3.4 km || 
|-id=155 bgcolor=#E9E9E9
| 221155 ||  || — || October 8, 2005 || Catalina || CSS || — || align=right | 2.1 km || 
|-id=156 bgcolor=#E9E9E9
| 221156 ||  || — || October 3, 2005 || Kitt Peak || Spacewatch || — || align=right | 2.4 km || 
|-id=157 bgcolor=#E9E9E9
| 221157 ||  || — || October 6, 2005 || Kitt Peak || Spacewatch || — || align=right | 3.1 km || 
|-id=158 bgcolor=#E9E9E9
| 221158 ||  || — || October 7, 2005 || Catalina || CSS || AER || align=right | 2.0 km || 
|-id=159 bgcolor=#E9E9E9
| 221159 ||  || — || October 8, 2005 || Socorro || LINEAR || — || align=right | 1.8 km || 
|-id=160 bgcolor=#E9E9E9
| 221160 ||  || — || October 10, 2005 || Kitt Peak || Spacewatch || RAF || align=right | 1.4 km || 
|-id=161 bgcolor=#E9E9E9
| 221161 ||  || — || October 4, 2005 || Catalina || CSS || — || align=right | 2.8 km || 
|-id=162 bgcolor=#E9E9E9
| 221162 ||  || — || October 7, 2005 || Bergisch Gladbach || W. Bickel || — || align=right | 1.0 km || 
|-id=163 bgcolor=#E9E9E9
| 221163 ||  || — || October 7, 2005 || Kitt Peak || Spacewatch || — || align=right | 1.1 km || 
|-id=164 bgcolor=#E9E9E9
| 221164 ||  || — || October 7, 2005 || Kitt Peak || Spacewatch || — || align=right data-sort-value="0.89" | 890 m || 
|-id=165 bgcolor=#E9E9E9
| 221165 ||  || — || October 7, 2005 || Kitt Peak || Spacewatch || RAF || align=right | 1.1 km || 
|-id=166 bgcolor=#E9E9E9
| 221166 ||  || — || October 7, 2005 || Kitt Peak || Spacewatch || HOF || align=right | 2.3 km || 
|-id=167 bgcolor=#E9E9E9
| 221167 ||  || — || October 7, 2005 || Kitt Peak || Spacewatch || MRX || align=right | 1.5 km || 
|-id=168 bgcolor=#E9E9E9
| 221168 ||  || — || October 7, 2005 || Kitt Peak || Spacewatch || — || align=right | 2.5 km || 
|-id=169 bgcolor=#E9E9E9
| 221169 ||  || — || October 6, 2005 || Kitt Peak || Spacewatch || — || align=right | 1.1 km || 
|-id=170 bgcolor=#E9E9E9
| 221170 ||  || — || October 7, 2005 || Catalina || CSS || — || align=right | 1.5 km || 
|-id=171 bgcolor=#E9E9E9
| 221171 ||  || — || October 9, 2005 || Kitt Peak || Spacewatch || — || align=right | 1.3 km || 
|-id=172 bgcolor=#E9E9E9
| 221172 ||  || — || October 10, 2005 || Anderson Mesa || LONEOS || — || align=right | 3.2 km || 
|-id=173 bgcolor=#E9E9E9
| 221173 ||  || — || October 10, 2005 || Catalina || CSS || — || align=right | 1.7 km || 
|-id=174 bgcolor=#E9E9E9
| 221174 ||  || — || October 1, 2005 || Kitt Peak || Spacewatch || — || align=right | 1.3 km || 
|-id=175 bgcolor=#E9E9E9
| 221175 ||  || — || October 26, 2005 || Ottmarsheim || C. Rinner || — || align=right | 2.3 km || 
|-id=176 bgcolor=#E9E9E9
| 221176 ||  || — || October 21, 2005 || Palomar || NEAT || RAF || align=right | 1.1 km || 
|-id=177 bgcolor=#E9E9E9
| 221177 ||  || — || October 21, 2005 || Palomar || NEAT || — || align=right | 3.1 km || 
|-id=178 bgcolor=#E9E9E9
| 221178 ||  || — || October 22, 2005 || Catalina || CSS || HEN || align=right | 1.3 km || 
|-id=179 bgcolor=#E9E9E9
| 221179 ||  || — || October 22, 2005 || Kitt Peak || Spacewatch || — || align=right | 2.4 km || 
|-id=180 bgcolor=#E9E9E9
| 221180 ||  || — || October 22, 2005 || Kitt Peak || Spacewatch || — || align=right | 5.8 km || 
|-id=181 bgcolor=#E9E9E9
| 221181 ||  || — || October 23, 2005 || Kitt Peak || Spacewatch || — || align=right | 2.0 km || 
|-id=182 bgcolor=#E9E9E9
| 221182 ||  || — || October 23, 2005 || Kitt Peak || Spacewatch || HEN || align=right | 1.2 km || 
|-id=183 bgcolor=#E9E9E9
| 221183 ||  || — || October 23, 2005 || Catalina || CSS || — || align=right | 2.0 km || 
|-id=184 bgcolor=#E9E9E9
| 221184 ||  || — || October 23, 2005 || Catalina || CSS || — || align=right | 3.2 km || 
|-id=185 bgcolor=#E9E9E9
| 221185 ||  || — || October 23, 2005 || Catalina || CSS || — || align=right | 2.7 km || 
|-id=186 bgcolor=#E9E9E9
| 221186 ||  || — || October 23, 2005 || Catalina || CSS || — || align=right | 3.5 km || 
|-id=187 bgcolor=#E9E9E9
| 221187 ||  || — || October 24, 2005 || Kitt Peak || Spacewatch || — || align=right | 1.7 km || 
|-id=188 bgcolor=#E9E9E9
| 221188 ||  || — || October 24, 2005 || Kitt Peak || Spacewatch || — || align=right | 2.0 km || 
|-id=189 bgcolor=#E9E9E9
| 221189 ||  || — || October 25, 2005 || Catalina || CSS || KON || align=right | 1.9 km || 
|-id=190 bgcolor=#E9E9E9
| 221190 ||  || — || October 22, 2005 || Kitt Peak || Spacewatch || — || align=right | 2.1 km || 
|-id=191 bgcolor=#E9E9E9
| 221191 ||  || — || October 22, 2005 || Palomar || NEAT || — || align=right | 1.3 km || 
|-id=192 bgcolor=#E9E9E9
| 221192 ||  || — || October 23, 2005 || Catalina || CSS || — || align=right | 3.4 km || 
|-id=193 bgcolor=#E9E9E9
| 221193 ||  || — || October 23, 2005 || Palomar || NEAT || — || align=right | 3.1 km || 
|-id=194 bgcolor=#E9E9E9
| 221194 ||  || — || October 23, 2005 || Catalina || CSS || — || align=right | 2.6 km || 
|-id=195 bgcolor=#E9E9E9
| 221195 ||  || — || October 23, 2005 || Catalina || CSS || — || align=right | 3.3 km || 
|-id=196 bgcolor=#E9E9E9
| 221196 ||  || — || October 23, 2005 || Catalina || CSS || — || align=right | 1.6 km || 
|-id=197 bgcolor=#E9E9E9
| 221197 ||  || — || October 23, 2005 || Catalina || CSS || — || align=right | 1.7 km || 
|-id=198 bgcolor=#E9E9E9
| 221198 ||  || — || October 23, 2005 || Catalina || CSS || — || align=right | 2.1 km || 
|-id=199 bgcolor=#E9E9E9
| 221199 ||  || — || October 23, 2005 || Catalina || CSS || — || align=right | 2.8 km || 
|-id=200 bgcolor=#E9E9E9
| 221200 ||  || — || October 23, 2005 || Catalina || CSS || — || align=right | 2.2 km || 
|}

221201–221300 

|-bgcolor=#E9E9E9
| 221201 ||  || — || October 24, 2005 || Anderson Mesa || LONEOS || — || align=right | 2.5 km || 
|-id=202 bgcolor=#E9E9E9
| 221202 ||  || — || October 25, 2005 || Mount Lemmon || Mount Lemmon Survey || — || align=right | 1.8 km || 
|-id=203 bgcolor=#E9E9E9
| 221203 ||  || — || October 22, 2005 || Catalina || CSS || — || align=right | 3.0 km || 
|-id=204 bgcolor=#E9E9E9
| 221204 ||  || — || October 22, 2005 || Palomar || NEAT || — || align=right | 1.7 km || 
|-id=205 bgcolor=#E9E9E9
| 221205 ||  || — || October 23, 2005 || Catalina || CSS || — || align=right | 3.0 km || 
|-id=206 bgcolor=#E9E9E9
| 221206 ||  || — || October 23, 2005 || Palomar || NEAT || HEN || align=right | 1.4 km || 
|-id=207 bgcolor=#E9E9E9
| 221207 ||  || — || October 23, 2005 || Palomar || NEAT || NEM || align=right | 3.5 km || 
|-id=208 bgcolor=#E9E9E9
| 221208 ||  || — || October 24, 2005 || Palomar || NEAT || — || align=right | 2.2 km || 
|-id=209 bgcolor=#E9E9E9
| 221209 ||  || — || October 24, 2005 || Palomar || NEAT || — || align=right | 2.5 km || 
|-id=210 bgcolor=#E9E9E9
| 221210 ||  || — || October 25, 2005 || Catalina || CSS || — || align=right | 4.2 km || 
|-id=211 bgcolor=#E9E9E9
| 221211 ||  || — || October 25, 2005 || Catalina || CSS || — || align=right | 2.7 km || 
|-id=212 bgcolor=#E9E9E9
| 221212 ||  || — || October 25, 2005 || Catalina || CSS || — || align=right | 2.3 km || 
|-id=213 bgcolor=#d6d6d6
| 221213 ||  || — || October 27, 2005 || Mount Lemmon || Mount Lemmon Survey || KAR || align=right | 1.4 km || 
|-id=214 bgcolor=#E9E9E9
| 221214 ||  || — || October 22, 2005 || Kitt Peak || Spacewatch || — || align=right | 1.3 km || 
|-id=215 bgcolor=#E9E9E9
| 221215 ||  || — || October 22, 2005 || Kitt Peak || Spacewatch || — || align=right | 1.1 km || 
|-id=216 bgcolor=#E9E9E9
| 221216 ||  || — || October 22, 2005 || Kitt Peak || Spacewatch || — || align=right | 2.9 km || 
|-id=217 bgcolor=#E9E9E9
| 221217 ||  || — || October 22, 2005 || Kitt Peak || Spacewatch || ADE || align=right | 3.2 km || 
|-id=218 bgcolor=#E9E9E9
| 221218 ||  || — || October 22, 2005 || Kitt Peak || Spacewatch || — || align=right | 3.3 km || 
|-id=219 bgcolor=#E9E9E9
| 221219 ||  || — || October 22, 2005 || Kitt Peak || Spacewatch || PAD || align=right | 2.0 km || 
|-id=220 bgcolor=#E9E9E9
| 221220 ||  || — || October 22, 2005 || Kitt Peak || Spacewatch || — || align=right | 2.6 km || 
|-id=221 bgcolor=#E9E9E9
| 221221 ||  || — || October 22, 2005 || Palomar || NEAT || MAR || align=right | 1.4 km || 
|-id=222 bgcolor=#E9E9E9
| 221222 ||  || — || October 24, 2005 || Kitt Peak || Spacewatch || — || align=right | 2.9 km || 
|-id=223 bgcolor=#E9E9E9
| 221223 ||  || — || October 24, 2005 || Kitt Peak || Spacewatch || — || align=right | 2.5 km || 
|-id=224 bgcolor=#d6d6d6
| 221224 ||  || — || October 24, 2005 || Kitt Peak || Spacewatch || KOR || align=right | 1.4 km || 
|-id=225 bgcolor=#E9E9E9
| 221225 ||  || — || October 24, 2005 || Palomar || NEAT || — || align=right | 3.6 km || 
|-id=226 bgcolor=#E9E9E9
| 221226 ||  || — || October 25, 2005 || Kitt Peak || Spacewatch || — || align=right | 2.1 km || 
|-id=227 bgcolor=#E9E9E9
| 221227 ||  || — || October 26, 2005 || Kitt Peak || Spacewatch || — || align=right | 2.1 km || 
|-id=228 bgcolor=#E9E9E9
| 221228 ||  || — || October 24, 2005 || Kitt Peak || Spacewatch || — || align=right | 3.8 km || 
|-id=229 bgcolor=#E9E9E9
| 221229 ||  || — || October 28, 2005 || Junk Bond || D. Healy || — || align=right | 1.4 km || 
|-id=230 bgcolor=#E9E9E9
| 221230 Sanaloria ||  ||  || October 30, 2005 || Nogales || J.-C. Merlin || — || align=right | 2.7 km || 
|-id=231 bgcolor=#E9E9E9
| 221231 ||  || — || October 22, 2005 || Catalina || CSS || ADE || align=right | 2.4 km || 
|-id=232 bgcolor=#E9E9E9
| 221232 ||  || — || October 24, 2005 || Kitt Peak || Spacewatch || — || align=right | 3.1 km || 
|-id=233 bgcolor=#E9E9E9
| 221233 ||  || — || October 24, 2005 || Kitt Peak || Spacewatch || WIT || align=right | 1.5 km || 
|-id=234 bgcolor=#E9E9E9
| 221234 ||  || — || October 24, 2005 || Kitt Peak || Spacewatch || — || align=right | 1.8 km || 
|-id=235 bgcolor=#E9E9E9
| 221235 ||  || — || October 24, 2005 || Kitt Peak || Spacewatch || AST || align=right | 1.9 km || 
|-id=236 bgcolor=#E9E9E9
| 221236 ||  || — || October 27, 2005 || Mount Lemmon || Mount Lemmon Survey || — || align=right | 2.1 km || 
|-id=237 bgcolor=#E9E9E9
| 221237 ||  || — || October 27, 2005 || Mount Lemmon || Mount Lemmon Survey || — || align=right | 1.8 km || 
|-id=238 bgcolor=#E9E9E9
| 221238 ||  || — || October 25, 2005 || Kitt Peak || Spacewatch || — || align=right | 2.2 km || 
|-id=239 bgcolor=#E9E9E9
| 221239 ||  || — || October 25, 2005 || Mount Lemmon || Mount Lemmon Survey || — || align=right | 3.3 km || 
|-id=240 bgcolor=#E9E9E9
| 221240 ||  || — || October 27, 2005 || Palomar || NEAT || — || align=right | 3.8 km || 
|-id=241 bgcolor=#E9E9E9
| 221241 ||  || — || October 27, 2005 || Palomar || NEAT || — || align=right | 3.0 km || 
|-id=242 bgcolor=#E9E9E9
| 221242 ||  || — || October 25, 2005 || Mount Lemmon || Mount Lemmon Survey || MIS || align=right | 3.9 km || 
|-id=243 bgcolor=#d6d6d6
| 221243 ||  || — || October 25, 2005 || Kitt Peak || Spacewatch || — || align=right | 2.4 km || 
|-id=244 bgcolor=#E9E9E9
| 221244 ||  || — || October 25, 2005 || Kitt Peak || Spacewatch || — || align=right | 2.2 km || 
|-id=245 bgcolor=#E9E9E9
| 221245 ||  || — || October 25, 2005 || Kitt Peak || Spacewatch || — || align=right | 2.8 km || 
|-id=246 bgcolor=#E9E9E9
| 221246 ||  || — || October 25, 2005 || Kitt Peak || Spacewatch || GEF || align=right | 1.8 km || 
|-id=247 bgcolor=#E9E9E9
| 221247 ||  || — || October 26, 2005 || Kitt Peak || Spacewatch || — || align=right | 3.6 km || 
|-id=248 bgcolor=#E9E9E9
| 221248 ||  || — || October 23, 2005 || Palomar || NEAT || — || align=right | 1.5 km || 
|-id=249 bgcolor=#E9E9E9
| 221249 ||  || — || October 25, 2005 || Kitt Peak || Spacewatch || — || align=right | 1.8 km || 
|-id=250 bgcolor=#E9E9E9
| 221250 ||  || — || October 28, 2005 || Kitt Peak || Spacewatch || — || align=right | 3.2 km || 
|-id=251 bgcolor=#E9E9E9
| 221251 ||  || — || October 25, 2005 || Kitt Peak || Spacewatch || — || align=right | 2.2 km || 
|-id=252 bgcolor=#E9E9E9
| 221252 ||  || — || October 25, 2005 || Kitt Peak || Spacewatch || XIZ || align=right | 2.0 km || 
|-id=253 bgcolor=#E9E9E9
| 221253 ||  || — || October 27, 2005 || Kitt Peak || Spacewatch || — || align=right | 1.6 km || 
|-id=254 bgcolor=#E9E9E9
| 221254 ||  || — || October 25, 2005 || Palomar || NEAT || — || align=right | 2.2 km || 
|-id=255 bgcolor=#E9E9E9
| 221255 ||  || — || October 29, 2005 || Kitt Peak || Spacewatch || PAD || align=right | 2.5 km || 
|-id=256 bgcolor=#E9E9E9
| 221256 ||  || — || October 26, 2005 || Kitt Peak || Spacewatch || HEN || align=right | 1.1 km || 
|-id=257 bgcolor=#E9E9E9
| 221257 ||  || — || October 26, 2005 || Kitt Peak || Spacewatch || — || align=right | 1.8 km || 
|-id=258 bgcolor=#E9E9E9
| 221258 ||  || — || October 26, 2005 || Kitt Peak || Spacewatch || — || align=right | 2.0 km || 
|-id=259 bgcolor=#E9E9E9
| 221259 ||  || — || October 26, 2005 || Kitt Peak || Spacewatch || — || align=right | 1.9 km || 
|-id=260 bgcolor=#E9E9E9
| 221260 ||  || — || October 26, 2005 || Kitt Peak || Spacewatch || — || align=right | 2.1 km || 
|-id=261 bgcolor=#E9E9E9
| 221261 ||  || — || October 26, 2005 || Kitt Peak || Spacewatch || — || align=right | 3.3 km || 
|-id=262 bgcolor=#E9E9E9
| 221262 ||  || — || October 27, 2005 || Mount Lemmon || Mount Lemmon Survey || — || align=right | 1.6 km || 
|-id=263 bgcolor=#E9E9E9
| 221263 ||  || — || October 28, 2005 || Mount Lemmon || Mount Lemmon Survey || — || align=right | 1.5 km || 
|-id=264 bgcolor=#E9E9E9
| 221264 ||  || — || October 28, 2005 || Socorro || LINEAR || — || align=right | 2.8 km || 
|-id=265 bgcolor=#d6d6d6
| 221265 ||  || — || October 28, 2005 || Kitt Peak || Spacewatch || — || align=right | 4.3 km || 
|-id=266 bgcolor=#E9E9E9
| 221266 ||  || — || October 29, 2005 || Mount Lemmon || Mount Lemmon Survey || — || align=right | 1.8 km || 
|-id=267 bgcolor=#E9E9E9
| 221267 ||  || — || October 27, 2005 || Socorro || LINEAR || — || align=right | 3.7 km || 
|-id=268 bgcolor=#E9E9E9
| 221268 ||  || — || October 27, 2005 || Kitt Peak || Spacewatch || — || align=right | 1.5 km || 
|-id=269 bgcolor=#E9E9E9
| 221269 ||  || — || October 27, 2005 || Kitt Peak || Spacewatch || — || align=right | 2.0 km || 
|-id=270 bgcolor=#E9E9E9
| 221270 ||  || — || October 27, 2005 || Mount Lemmon || Mount Lemmon Survey || AEO || align=right | 1.7 km || 
|-id=271 bgcolor=#E9E9E9
| 221271 ||  || — || October 28, 2005 || Kitt Peak || Spacewatch || — || align=right | 2.1 km || 
|-id=272 bgcolor=#E9E9E9
| 221272 ||  || — || October 29, 2005 || Kitt Peak || Spacewatch || — || align=right | 2.2 km || 
|-id=273 bgcolor=#E9E9E9
| 221273 ||  || — || October 29, 2005 || Mount Lemmon || Mount Lemmon Survey || NEM || align=right | 3.1 km || 
|-id=274 bgcolor=#E9E9E9
| 221274 ||  || — || October 30, 2005 || Palomar || NEAT || — || align=right | 2.6 km || 
|-id=275 bgcolor=#E9E9E9
| 221275 ||  || — || October 31, 2005 || Kitt Peak || Spacewatch || — || align=right | 2.0 km || 
|-id=276 bgcolor=#E9E9E9
| 221276 ||  || — || October 31, 2005 || Kitt Peak || Spacewatch || AGN || align=right | 1.4 km || 
|-id=277 bgcolor=#E9E9E9
| 221277 ||  || — || October 31, 2005 || Kitt Peak || Spacewatch || — || align=right | 2.0 km || 
|-id=278 bgcolor=#E9E9E9
| 221278 ||  || — || October 31, 2005 || Catalina || CSS || MRX || align=right | 1.4 km || 
|-id=279 bgcolor=#E9E9E9
| 221279 ||  || — || October 23, 2005 || Palomar || NEAT || EUN || align=right | 2.9 km || 
|-id=280 bgcolor=#E9E9E9
| 221280 ||  || — || October 24, 2005 || Palomar || NEAT || JUN || align=right | 1.5 km || 
|-id=281 bgcolor=#E9E9E9
| 221281 ||  || — || October 29, 2005 || Catalina || CSS || — || align=right | 1.5 km || 
|-id=282 bgcolor=#E9E9E9
| 221282 ||  || — || October 29, 2005 || Catalina || CSS || — || align=right | 3.1 km || 
|-id=283 bgcolor=#E9E9E9
| 221283 ||  || — || October 29, 2005 || Kitt Peak || Spacewatch || — || align=right | 2.6 km || 
|-id=284 bgcolor=#E9E9E9
| 221284 ||  || — || October 29, 2005 || Mount Lemmon || Mount Lemmon Survey || HEN || align=right | 1.6 km || 
|-id=285 bgcolor=#E9E9E9
| 221285 ||  || — || October 24, 2005 || Kitt Peak || Spacewatch || — || align=right | 1.5 km || 
|-id=286 bgcolor=#d6d6d6
| 221286 ||  || — || October 27, 2005 || Kitt Peak || Spacewatch || KOR || align=right | 1.7 km || 
|-id=287 bgcolor=#E9E9E9
| 221287 ||  || — || October 29, 2005 || Mount Lemmon || Mount Lemmon Survey || — || align=right | 1.9 km || 
|-id=288 bgcolor=#E9E9E9
| 221288 ||  || — || October 27, 2005 || Socorro || LINEAR || — || align=right | 1.7 km || 
|-id=289 bgcolor=#E9E9E9
| 221289 ||  || — || October 30, 2005 || Catalina || CSS || EUN || align=right | 2.0 km || 
|-id=290 bgcolor=#E9E9E9
| 221290 ||  || — || October 29, 2005 || Catalina || CSS || — || align=right | 1.6 km || 
|-id=291 bgcolor=#E9E9E9
| 221291 ||  || — || October 29, 2005 || Catalina || CSS || — || align=right | 2.6 km || 
|-id=292 bgcolor=#E9E9E9
| 221292 ||  || — || October 30, 2005 || Socorro || LINEAR || RAF || align=right | 1.6 km || 
|-id=293 bgcolor=#E9E9E9
| 221293 ||  || — || October 30, 2005 || Socorro || LINEAR || GEF || align=right | 1.8 km || 
|-id=294 bgcolor=#E9E9E9
| 221294 ||  || — || October 30, 2005 || Mount Lemmon || Mount Lemmon Survey || AGN || align=right | 1.8 km || 
|-id=295 bgcolor=#E9E9E9
| 221295 ||  || — || October 28, 2005 || Mount Lemmon || Mount Lemmon Survey || — || align=right | 2.9 km || 
|-id=296 bgcolor=#E9E9E9
| 221296 ||  || — || October 31, 2005 || Mount Lemmon || Mount Lemmon Survey || — || align=right | 1.9 km || 
|-id=297 bgcolor=#E9E9E9
| 221297 ||  || — || October 22, 2005 || Catalina || CSS || — || align=right | 1.6 km || 
|-id=298 bgcolor=#E9E9E9
| 221298 ||  || — || October 23, 2005 || Catalina || CSS || MAR || align=right | 1.6 km || 
|-id=299 bgcolor=#E9E9E9
| 221299 ||  || — || October 23, 2005 || Catalina || CSS || — || align=right | 3.4 km || 
|-id=300 bgcolor=#E9E9E9
| 221300 ||  || — || October 25, 2005 || Catalina || CSS || ADE || align=right | 2.9 km || 
|}

221301–221400 

|-bgcolor=#E9E9E9
| 221301 ||  || — || October 25, 2005 || Catalina || CSS || — || align=right | 3.0 km || 
|-id=302 bgcolor=#E9E9E9
| 221302 ||  || — || October 27, 2005 || Anderson Mesa || LONEOS || — || align=right | 2.6 km || 
|-id=303 bgcolor=#E9E9E9
| 221303 ||  || — || October 27, 2005 || Catalina || CSS || JUN || align=right | 1.3 km || 
|-id=304 bgcolor=#E9E9E9
| 221304 ||  || — || October 28, 2005 || Kitt Peak || Spacewatch || HOF || align=right | 3.6 km || 
|-id=305 bgcolor=#E9E9E9
| 221305 ||  || — || October 28, 2005 || Kitt Peak || Spacewatch || — || align=right | 2.7 km || 
|-id=306 bgcolor=#E9E9E9
| 221306 ||  || — || October 26, 2005 || Apache Point || A. C. Becker || PAD || align=right | 2.0 km || 
|-id=307 bgcolor=#E9E9E9
| 221307 ||  || — || October 25, 2005 || Mount Lemmon || Mount Lemmon Survey || AGN || align=right | 1.4 km || 
|-id=308 bgcolor=#E9E9E9
| 221308 || 2005 VX || — || November 3, 2005 || Cordell–Lorenz || E. S. Beeson || PAD || align=right | 2.1 km || 
|-id=309 bgcolor=#E9E9E9
| 221309 ||  || — || November 6, 2005 || Mayhill || A. Lowe || RAF || align=right | 1.7 km || 
|-id=310 bgcolor=#E9E9E9
| 221310 ||  || — || November 2, 2005 || Catalina || CSS || — || align=right | 1.8 km || 
|-id=311 bgcolor=#E9E9E9
| 221311 ||  || — || November 3, 2005 || Catalina || CSS || MAR || align=right | 1.8 km || 
|-id=312 bgcolor=#E9E9E9
| 221312 ||  || — || November 3, 2005 || Mount Lemmon || Mount Lemmon Survey || GEF || align=right | 1.7 km || 
|-id=313 bgcolor=#E9E9E9
| 221313 ||  || — || November 3, 2005 || Socorro || LINEAR || — || align=right | 1.3 km || 
|-id=314 bgcolor=#E9E9E9
| 221314 ||  || — || November 3, 2005 || Catalina || CSS || GEF || align=right | 2.0 km || 
|-id=315 bgcolor=#E9E9E9
| 221315 ||  || — || November 3, 2005 || Catalina || CSS || — || align=right | 3.1 km || 
|-id=316 bgcolor=#E9E9E9
| 221316 ||  || — || November 3, 2005 || Catalina || CSS || — || align=right | 1.7 km || 
|-id=317 bgcolor=#E9E9E9
| 221317 ||  || — || November 3, 2005 || Catalina || CSS || — || align=right | 2.5 km || 
|-id=318 bgcolor=#E9E9E9
| 221318 ||  || — || November 3, 2005 || Mount Lemmon || Mount Lemmon Survey || — || align=right | 2.0 km || 
|-id=319 bgcolor=#E9E9E9
| 221319 ||  || — || November 5, 2005 || Catalina || CSS || JNS || align=right | 4.5 km || 
|-id=320 bgcolor=#E9E9E9
| 221320 ||  || — || November 5, 2005 || Mount Lemmon || Mount Lemmon Survey || — || align=right | 2.8 km || 
|-id=321 bgcolor=#E9E9E9
| 221321 ||  || — || November 4, 2005 || Mount Lemmon || Mount Lemmon Survey || — || align=right | 2.0 km || 
|-id=322 bgcolor=#E9E9E9
| 221322 ||  || — || November 7, 2005 || Socorro || LINEAR || RAF || align=right | 1.3 km || 
|-id=323 bgcolor=#E9E9E9
| 221323 ||  || — || November 10, 2005 || Catalina || CSS || — || align=right | 3.8 km || 
|-id=324 bgcolor=#E9E9E9
| 221324 ||  || — || November 1, 2005 || Anderson Mesa || LONEOS || MIT || align=right | 5.2 km || 
|-id=325 bgcolor=#E9E9E9
| 221325 ||  || — || November 1, 2005 || Kitt Peak || Spacewatch || — || align=right | 2.3 km || 
|-id=326 bgcolor=#E9E9E9
| 221326 ||  || — || November 1, 2005 || Socorro || LINEAR || — || align=right | 2.0 km || 
|-id=327 bgcolor=#E9E9E9
| 221327 ||  || — || November 6, 2005 || Mount Lemmon || Mount Lemmon Survey || — || align=right | 2.1 km || 
|-id=328 bgcolor=#E9E9E9
| 221328 ||  || — || November 12, 2005 || Catalina || CSS || MAR || align=right | 2.1 km || 
|-id=329 bgcolor=#d6d6d6
| 221329 ||  || — || November 12, 2005 || Kitt Peak || Spacewatch || HYG || align=right | 3.6 km || 
|-id=330 bgcolor=#E9E9E9
| 221330 ||  || — || November 12, 2005 || Kitt Peak || Spacewatch || — || align=right | 2.4 km || 
|-id=331 bgcolor=#E9E9E9
| 221331 ||  || — || November 1, 2005 || Apache Point || A. C. Becker || — || align=right | 2.8 km || 
|-id=332 bgcolor=#d6d6d6
| 221332 ||  || — || November 22, 2005 || Wrightwood || J. W. Young || KOR || align=right | 1.7 km || 
|-id=333 bgcolor=#E9E9E9
| 221333 ||  || — || November 22, 2005 || Socorro || LINEAR || BAR || align=right | 2.2 km || 
|-id=334 bgcolor=#E9E9E9
| 221334 ||  || — || November 20, 2005 || Palomar || NEAT || ADE || align=right | 3.8 km || 
|-id=335 bgcolor=#E9E9E9
| 221335 ||  || — || November 21, 2005 || Kitt Peak || Spacewatch || PAD || align=right | 2.3 km || 
|-id=336 bgcolor=#E9E9E9
| 221336 ||  || — || November 22, 2005 || Palomar || NEAT || IAN || align=right | 1.7 km || 
|-id=337 bgcolor=#d6d6d6
| 221337 ||  || — || November 22, 2005 || Kitt Peak || Spacewatch || — || align=right | 3.0 km || 
|-id=338 bgcolor=#E9E9E9
| 221338 ||  || — || November 22, 2005 || Kitt Peak || Spacewatch || — || align=right | 3.2 km || 
|-id=339 bgcolor=#E9E9E9
| 221339 ||  || — || November 21, 2005 || Kitt Peak || Spacewatch || AGN || align=right | 1.3 km || 
|-id=340 bgcolor=#E9E9E9
| 221340 ||  || — || November 21, 2005 || Kitt Peak || Spacewatch || — || align=right | 1.7 km || 
|-id=341 bgcolor=#d6d6d6
| 221341 ||  || — || November 22, 2005 || Kitt Peak || Spacewatch || KOR || align=right | 2.0 km || 
|-id=342 bgcolor=#d6d6d6
| 221342 ||  || — || November 26, 2005 || Marly || Naef Obs. || — || align=right | 4.4 km || 
|-id=343 bgcolor=#E9E9E9
| 221343 ||  || — || November 26, 2005 || Marly || Naef Obs. || — || align=right | 3.4 km || 
|-id=344 bgcolor=#E9E9E9
| 221344 ||  || — || November 26, 2005 || Mount Lemmon || Mount Lemmon Survey || HOF || align=right | 3.9 km || 
|-id=345 bgcolor=#d6d6d6
| 221345 ||  || — || November 26, 2005 || Mount Lemmon || Mount Lemmon Survey || THM || align=right | 3.3 km || 
|-id=346 bgcolor=#E9E9E9
| 221346 ||  || — || November 28, 2005 || Mount Lemmon || Mount Lemmon Survey || — || align=right | 2.2 km || 
|-id=347 bgcolor=#E9E9E9
| 221347 ||  || — || November 28, 2005 || Mount Lemmon || Mount Lemmon Survey || — || align=right | 2.7 km || 
|-id=348 bgcolor=#E9E9E9
| 221348 ||  || — || November 26, 2005 || Kitt Peak || Spacewatch || — || align=right | 1.4 km || 
|-id=349 bgcolor=#d6d6d6
| 221349 ||  || — || November 26, 2005 || Kitt Peak || Spacewatch || — || align=right | 4.8 km || 
|-id=350 bgcolor=#E9E9E9
| 221350 ||  || — || November 26, 2005 || Catalina || CSS || — || align=right | 2.8 km || 
|-id=351 bgcolor=#E9E9E9
| 221351 ||  || — || November 29, 2005 || Mount Lemmon || Mount Lemmon Survey || HEN || align=right | 1.5 km || 
|-id=352 bgcolor=#E9E9E9
| 221352 ||  || — || November 30, 2005 || Kitt Peak || Spacewatch || — || align=right | 3.1 km || 
|-id=353 bgcolor=#E9E9E9
| 221353 ||  || — || November 28, 2005 || Socorro || LINEAR || — || align=right | 2.7 km || 
|-id=354 bgcolor=#E9E9E9
| 221354 ||  || — || November 25, 2005 || Kitt Peak || Spacewatch || — || align=right | 2.6 km || 
|-id=355 bgcolor=#E9E9E9
| 221355 ||  || — || November 28, 2005 || Catalina || CSS || CLO || align=right | 3.0 km || 
|-id=356 bgcolor=#d6d6d6
| 221356 ||  || — || November 25, 2005 || Mount Lemmon || Mount Lemmon Survey || — || align=right | 3.2 km || 
|-id=357 bgcolor=#d6d6d6
| 221357 ||  || — || November 25, 2005 || Mount Lemmon || Mount Lemmon Survey || K-2 || align=right | 1.5 km || 
|-id=358 bgcolor=#d6d6d6
| 221358 ||  || — || November 26, 2005 || Mount Lemmon || Mount Lemmon Survey || — || align=right | 4.4 km || 
|-id=359 bgcolor=#E9E9E9
| 221359 ||  || — || November 26, 2005 || Catalina || CSS || MAR || align=right | 1.9 km || 
|-id=360 bgcolor=#E9E9E9
| 221360 ||  || — || November 28, 2005 || Catalina || CSS || — || align=right | 1.8 km || 
|-id=361 bgcolor=#E9E9E9
| 221361 ||  || — || November 29, 2005 || Kitt Peak || Spacewatch || — || align=right | 3.6 km || 
|-id=362 bgcolor=#d6d6d6
| 221362 ||  || — || November 26, 2005 || Mount Lemmon || Mount Lemmon Survey || — || align=right | 4.6 km || 
|-id=363 bgcolor=#E9E9E9
| 221363 ||  || — || November 28, 2005 || Palomar || NEAT || EUN || align=right | 2.8 km || 
|-id=364 bgcolor=#E9E9E9
| 221364 ||  || — || November 30, 2005 || Kitt Peak || Spacewatch || HEN || align=right | 1.2 km || 
|-id=365 bgcolor=#E9E9E9
| 221365 ||  || — || November 28, 2005 || Socorro || LINEAR || CLO || align=right | 2.9 km || 
|-id=366 bgcolor=#E9E9E9
| 221366 ||  || — || November 29, 2005 || Mount Lemmon || Mount Lemmon Survey || — || align=right | 4.0 km || 
|-id=367 bgcolor=#d6d6d6
| 221367 ||  || — || November 30, 2005 || Kitt Peak || Spacewatch || KOR || align=right | 1.3 km || 
|-id=368 bgcolor=#E9E9E9
| 221368 ||  || — || November 26, 2005 || Socorro || LINEAR || — || align=right | 3.1 km || 
|-id=369 bgcolor=#E9E9E9
| 221369 ||  || — || November 28, 2005 || Palomar || NEAT || AER || align=right | 2.0 km || 
|-id=370 bgcolor=#d6d6d6
| 221370 ||  || — || November 29, 2005 || Socorro || LINEAR || — || align=right | 5.0 km || 
|-id=371 bgcolor=#E9E9E9
| 221371 || 2005 XU || — || December 2, 2005 || Mayhill || A. Lowe || RAF || align=right | 1.7 km || 
|-id=372 bgcolor=#E9E9E9
| 221372 ||  || — || December 2, 2005 || Socorro || LINEAR || — || align=right | 1.8 km || 
|-id=373 bgcolor=#E9E9E9
| 221373 ||  || — || December 2, 2005 || Mount Lemmon || Mount Lemmon Survey || — || align=right | 2.1 km || 
|-id=374 bgcolor=#E9E9E9
| 221374 ||  || — || December 5, 2005 || Kitt Peak || Spacewatch || HEN || align=right | 1.1 km || 
|-id=375 bgcolor=#E9E9E9
| 221375 ||  || — || December 5, 2005 || Socorro || LINEAR || — || align=right | 3.1 km || 
|-id=376 bgcolor=#fefefe
| 221376 ||  || — || December 5, 2005 || Socorro || LINEAR || — || align=right | 1.2 km || 
|-id=377 bgcolor=#E9E9E9
| 221377 ||  || — || December 5, 2005 || Kitt Peak || Spacewatch || — || align=right | 2.5 km || 
|-id=378 bgcolor=#E9E9E9
| 221378 ||  || — || December 4, 2005 || Catalina || CSS || — || align=right | 2.3 km || 
|-id=379 bgcolor=#d6d6d6
| 221379 ||  || — || December 8, 2005 || Kitt Peak || Spacewatch || — || align=right | 3.2 km || 
|-id=380 bgcolor=#d6d6d6
| 221380 ||  || — || December 10, 2005 || Socorro || LINEAR || — || align=right | 6.8 km || 
|-id=381 bgcolor=#d6d6d6
| 221381 ||  || — || December 5, 2005 || Kitt Peak || Spacewatch || HYG || align=right | 4.9 km || 
|-id=382 bgcolor=#E9E9E9
| 221382 ||  || — || December 21, 2005 || Kitt Peak || Spacewatch || HOF || align=right | 2.9 km || 
|-id=383 bgcolor=#E9E9E9
| 221383 ||  || — || December 21, 2005 || Kitt Peak || Spacewatch || AST || align=right | 1.8 km || 
|-id=384 bgcolor=#d6d6d6
| 221384 ||  || — || December 22, 2005 || Kitt Peak || Spacewatch || — || align=right | 2.7 km || 
|-id=385 bgcolor=#d6d6d6
| 221385 ||  || — || December 23, 2005 || Kitt Peak || Spacewatch || — || align=right | 2.6 km || 
|-id=386 bgcolor=#d6d6d6
| 221386 ||  || — || December 24, 2005 || Kitt Peak || Spacewatch || HYG || align=right | 4.4 km || 
|-id=387 bgcolor=#d6d6d6
| 221387 ||  || — || December 22, 2005 || Kitt Peak || Spacewatch || — || align=right | 4.9 km || 
|-id=388 bgcolor=#E9E9E9
| 221388 ||  || — || December 24, 2005 || Kitt Peak || Spacewatch || — || align=right | 2.0 km || 
|-id=389 bgcolor=#d6d6d6
| 221389 ||  || — || December 24, 2005 || Kitt Peak || Spacewatch || — || align=right | 4.4 km || 
|-id=390 bgcolor=#d6d6d6
| 221390 ||  || — || December 24, 2005 || Kitt Peak || Spacewatch || — || align=right | 3.0 km || 
|-id=391 bgcolor=#d6d6d6
| 221391 ||  || — || December 25, 2005 || Kitt Peak || Spacewatch || THM || align=right | 3.5 km || 
|-id=392 bgcolor=#E9E9E9
| 221392 ||  || — || December 22, 2005 || Catalina || CSS || — || align=right | 4.0 km || 
|-id=393 bgcolor=#d6d6d6
| 221393 ||  || — || December 24, 2005 || Kitt Peak || Spacewatch || URS || align=right | 4.7 km || 
|-id=394 bgcolor=#d6d6d6
| 221394 ||  || — || December 26, 2005 || Mount Lemmon || Mount Lemmon Survey || K-2 || align=right | 1.5 km || 
|-id=395 bgcolor=#d6d6d6
| 221395 ||  || — || December 25, 2005 || Mount Lemmon || Mount Lemmon Survey || — || align=right | 2.5 km || 
|-id=396 bgcolor=#d6d6d6
| 221396 ||  || — || December 22, 2005 || Catalina || CSS || — || align=right | 4.3 km || 
|-id=397 bgcolor=#E9E9E9
| 221397 ||  || — || December 23, 2005 || Kitt Peak || Spacewatch || HEN || align=right | 1.1 km || 
|-id=398 bgcolor=#d6d6d6
| 221398 ||  || — || December 24, 2005 || Kitt Peak || Spacewatch || — || align=right | 3.7 km || 
|-id=399 bgcolor=#d6d6d6
| 221399 ||  || — || December 24, 2005 || Kitt Peak || Spacewatch || — || align=right | 3.5 km || 
|-id=400 bgcolor=#d6d6d6
| 221400 ||  || — || December 26, 2005 || Kitt Peak || Spacewatch || — || align=right | 3.7 km || 
|}

221401–221500 

|-bgcolor=#d6d6d6
| 221401 ||  || — || December 26, 2005 || Kitt Peak || Spacewatch || THM || align=right | 3.2 km || 
|-id=402 bgcolor=#d6d6d6
| 221402 ||  || — || December 24, 2005 || Kitt Peak || Spacewatch || — || align=right | 4.9 km || 
|-id=403 bgcolor=#d6d6d6
| 221403 ||  || — || December 24, 2005 || Kitt Peak || Spacewatch || — || align=right | 2.5 km || 
|-id=404 bgcolor=#d6d6d6
| 221404 ||  || — || December 24, 2005 || Kitt Peak || Spacewatch || — || align=right | 3.7 km || 
|-id=405 bgcolor=#d6d6d6
| 221405 ||  || — || December 26, 2005 || Kitt Peak || Spacewatch || — || align=right | 4.5 km || 
|-id=406 bgcolor=#d6d6d6
| 221406 ||  || — || December 24, 2005 || Kitt Peak || Spacewatch || KOR || align=right | 1.8 km || 
|-id=407 bgcolor=#d6d6d6
| 221407 ||  || — || December 25, 2005 || Kitt Peak || Spacewatch || KOR || align=right | 2.3 km || 
|-id=408 bgcolor=#d6d6d6
| 221408 ||  || — || December 27, 2005 || Mount Lemmon || Mount Lemmon Survey || EOS || align=right | 3.8 km || 
|-id=409 bgcolor=#d6d6d6
| 221409 ||  || — || December 28, 2005 || Mount Lemmon || Mount Lemmon Survey || — || align=right | 3.2 km || 
|-id=410 bgcolor=#d6d6d6
| 221410 ||  || — || December 24, 2005 || Kitt Peak || Spacewatch || EOS || align=right | 3.1 km || 
|-id=411 bgcolor=#d6d6d6
| 221411 ||  || — || December 25, 2005 || Kitt Peak || Spacewatch || — || align=right | 4.1 km || 
|-id=412 bgcolor=#E9E9E9
| 221412 ||  || — || December 26, 2005 || Kitt Peak || Spacewatch || NEM || align=right | 3.7 km || 
|-id=413 bgcolor=#d6d6d6
| 221413 ||  || — || December 25, 2005 || Mount Lemmon || Mount Lemmon Survey || EOS || align=right | 2.7 km || 
|-id=414 bgcolor=#d6d6d6
| 221414 ||  || — || December 26, 2005 || Kitt Peak || Spacewatch || — || align=right | 5.6 km || 
|-id=415 bgcolor=#d6d6d6
| 221415 ||  || — || December 26, 2005 || Kitt Peak || Spacewatch || — || align=right | 4.3 km || 
|-id=416 bgcolor=#d6d6d6
| 221416 ||  || — || December 28, 2005 || Mount Lemmon || Mount Lemmon Survey || KOR || align=right | 2.2 km || 
|-id=417 bgcolor=#d6d6d6
| 221417 ||  || — || December 28, 2005 || Mount Lemmon || Mount Lemmon Survey || — || align=right | 4.4 km || 
|-id=418 bgcolor=#d6d6d6
| 221418 ||  || — || December 29, 2005 || Kitt Peak || Spacewatch || — || align=right | 2.6 km || 
|-id=419 bgcolor=#d6d6d6
| 221419 ||  || — || December 22, 2005 || Catalina || CSS || TIR || align=right | 5.1 km || 
|-id=420 bgcolor=#d6d6d6
| 221420 ||  || — || December 22, 2005 || Catalina || CSS || EUP || align=right | 6.5 km || 
|-id=421 bgcolor=#d6d6d6
| 221421 ||  || — || December 25, 2005 || Anderson Mesa || LONEOS || URS || align=right | 5.8 km || 
|-id=422 bgcolor=#d6d6d6
| 221422 ||  || — || December 25, 2005 || Anderson Mesa || LONEOS || — || align=right | 5.0 km || 
|-id=423 bgcolor=#d6d6d6
| 221423 ||  || — || December 22, 2005 || Kitt Peak || Spacewatch || — || align=right | 3.7 km || 
|-id=424 bgcolor=#E9E9E9
| 221424 ||  || — || December 31, 2005 || Socorro || LINEAR || — || align=right | 2.8 km || 
|-id=425 bgcolor=#E9E9E9
| 221425 ||  || — || December 24, 2005 || Socorro || LINEAR || — || align=right | 3.1 km || 
|-id=426 bgcolor=#d6d6d6
| 221426 ||  || — || December 30, 2005 || Kitt Peak || Spacewatch || KOR || align=right | 1.8 km || 
|-id=427 bgcolor=#d6d6d6
| 221427 ||  || — || December 29, 2005 || Mount Lemmon || Mount Lemmon Survey || — || align=right | 2.7 km || 
|-id=428 bgcolor=#d6d6d6
| 221428 ||  || — || December 25, 2005 || Catalina || CSS || EUP || align=right | 7.1 km || 
|-id=429 bgcolor=#d6d6d6
| 221429 ||  || — || December 24, 2005 || Kitt Peak || Spacewatch || KOR || align=right | 2.1 km || 
|-id=430 bgcolor=#d6d6d6
| 221430 ||  || — || December 26, 2005 || Mount Lemmon || Mount Lemmon Survey || KOR || align=right | 1.8 km || 
|-id=431 bgcolor=#d6d6d6
| 221431 ||  || — || December 28, 2005 || Mount Lemmon || Mount Lemmon Survey || — || align=right | 3.0 km || 
|-id=432 bgcolor=#d6d6d6
| 221432 ||  || — || December 28, 2005 || Kitt Peak || Spacewatch || HYG || align=right | 3.2 km || 
|-id=433 bgcolor=#d6d6d6
| 221433 ||  || — || December 29, 2005 || Kitt Peak || Spacewatch || — || align=right | 2.5 km || 
|-id=434 bgcolor=#d6d6d6
| 221434 ||  || — || December 30, 2005 || Kitt Peak || Spacewatch || HYG || align=right | 4.3 km || 
|-id=435 bgcolor=#d6d6d6
| 221435 ||  || — || January 4, 2006 || Catalina || CSS || — || align=right | 3.8 km || 
|-id=436 bgcolor=#d6d6d6
| 221436 ||  || — || January 5, 2006 || Anderson Mesa || LONEOS || — || align=right | 5.5 km || 
|-id=437 bgcolor=#d6d6d6
| 221437 ||  || — || January 5, 2006 || Mount Lemmon || Mount Lemmon Survey || THM || align=right | 3.5 km || 
|-id=438 bgcolor=#d6d6d6
| 221438 ||  || — || January 5, 2006 || Mount Lemmon || Mount Lemmon Survey || — || align=right | 2.8 km || 
|-id=439 bgcolor=#d6d6d6
| 221439 ||  || — || January 5, 2006 || Catalina || CSS || — || align=right | 4.0 km || 
|-id=440 bgcolor=#E9E9E9
| 221440 ||  || — || January 5, 2006 || Catalina || CSS || GEF || align=right | 2.1 km || 
|-id=441 bgcolor=#d6d6d6
| 221441 ||  || — || January 5, 2006 || Catalina || CSS || URS || align=right | 6.8 km || 
|-id=442 bgcolor=#d6d6d6
| 221442 ||  || — || January 6, 2006 || Mount Lemmon || Mount Lemmon Survey || — || align=right | 2.6 km || 
|-id=443 bgcolor=#d6d6d6
| 221443 ||  || — || January 7, 2006 || Kitt Peak || Spacewatch || — || align=right | 5.4 km || 
|-id=444 bgcolor=#d6d6d6
| 221444 ||  || — || January 7, 2006 || Mount Lemmon || Mount Lemmon Survey || — || align=right | 2.3 km || 
|-id=445 bgcolor=#d6d6d6
| 221445 ||  || — || January 6, 2006 || Mount Lemmon || Mount Lemmon Survey || KOR || align=right | 1.8 km || 
|-id=446 bgcolor=#d6d6d6
| 221446 ||  || — || January 6, 2006 || Mount Lemmon || Mount Lemmon Survey || — || align=right | 3.1 km || 
|-id=447 bgcolor=#d6d6d6
| 221447 ||  || — || January 2, 2006 || Socorro || LINEAR || — || align=right | 5.1 km || 
|-id=448 bgcolor=#d6d6d6
| 221448 ||  || — || January 4, 2006 || Socorro || LINEAR || — || align=right | 5.2 km || 
|-id=449 bgcolor=#d6d6d6
| 221449 ||  || — || January 7, 2006 || Anderson Mesa || LONEOS || EOS || align=right | 3.3 km || 
|-id=450 bgcolor=#d6d6d6
| 221450 ||  || — || January 6, 2006 || Mount Lemmon || Mount Lemmon Survey || HYG || align=right | 3.9 km || 
|-id=451 bgcolor=#E9E9E9
| 221451 ||  || — || January 19, 2006 || Catalina || CSS || MIT || align=right | 3.4 km || 
|-id=452 bgcolor=#d6d6d6
| 221452 ||  || — || January 20, 2006 || Kitt Peak || Spacewatch || — || align=right | 3.9 km || 
|-id=453 bgcolor=#d6d6d6
| 221453 ||  || — || January 20, 2006 || Catalina || CSS || — || align=right | 6.3 km || 
|-id=454 bgcolor=#d6d6d6
| 221454 ||  || — || January 23, 2006 || Piszkéstető || K. Sárneczky || EOS || align=right | 2.9 km || 
|-id=455 bgcolor=#FFC2E0
| 221455 ||  || — || January 23, 2006 || Kitt Peak || Spacewatch || APOPHAcritical || align=right data-sort-value="0.47" | 470 m || 
|-id=456 bgcolor=#d6d6d6
| 221456 ||  || — || January 21, 2006 || Mount Lemmon || Mount Lemmon Survey || — || align=right | 3.9 km || 
|-id=457 bgcolor=#d6d6d6
| 221457 ||  || — || January 23, 2006 || Mount Lemmon || Mount Lemmon Survey || — || align=right | 3.9 km || 
|-id=458 bgcolor=#d6d6d6
| 221458 ||  || — || January 22, 2006 || Mount Lemmon || Mount Lemmon Survey || VER || align=right | 4.3 km || 
|-id=459 bgcolor=#E9E9E9
| 221459 ||  || — || January 23, 2006 || Kitt Peak || Spacewatch || HEN || align=right | 1.8 km || 
|-id=460 bgcolor=#d6d6d6
| 221460 ||  || — || January 23, 2006 || Kitt Peak || Spacewatch || — || align=right | 4.8 km || 
|-id=461 bgcolor=#d6d6d6
| 221461 ||  || — || January 23, 2006 || Mount Lemmon || Mount Lemmon Survey || THM || align=right | 3.2 km || 
|-id=462 bgcolor=#d6d6d6
| 221462 ||  || — || January 24, 2006 || Socorro || LINEAR || KOR || align=right | 2.2 km || 
|-id=463 bgcolor=#d6d6d6
| 221463 ||  || — || January 25, 2006 || Kitt Peak || Spacewatch || — || align=right | 3.3 km || 
|-id=464 bgcolor=#d6d6d6
| 221464 ||  || — || January 25, 2006 || Kitt Peak || Spacewatch || — || align=right | 3.8 km || 
|-id=465 bgcolor=#d6d6d6
| 221465 Rapa Nui ||  ||  || January 28, 2006 || Nogales || J.-C. Merlin || — || align=right | 5.2 km || 
|-id=466 bgcolor=#d6d6d6
| 221466 ||  || — || January 26, 2006 || Kitt Peak || Spacewatch || — || align=right | 3.3 km || 
|-id=467 bgcolor=#d6d6d6
| 221467 ||  || — || January 26, 2006 || Kitt Peak || Spacewatch || — || align=right | 3.7 km || 
|-id=468 bgcolor=#d6d6d6
| 221468 ||  || — || January 27, 2006 || Mount Lemmon || Mount Lemmon Survey || THM || align=right | 2.7 km || 
|-id=469 bgcolor=#d6d6d6
| 221469 ||  || — || January 26, 2006 || Kitt Peak || Spacewatch || 7:4 || align=right | 5.3 km || 
|-id=470 bgcolor=#d6d6d6
| 221470 ||  || — || January 21, 2006 || Anderson Mesa || LONEOS || — || align=right | 3.9 km || 
|-id=471 bgcolor=#d6d6d6
| 221471 ||  || — || January 30, 2006 || Jarnac || Jarnac Obs. || — || align=right | 4.1 km || 
|-id=472 bgcolor=#d6d6d6
| 221472 ||  || — || January 23, 2006 || Kitt Peak || Spacewatch || — || align=right | 5.1 km || 
|-id=473 bgcolor=#d6d6d6
| 221473 ||  || — || January 25, 2006 || Kitt Peak || Spacewatch || ALA || align=right | 5.0 km || 
|-id=474 bgcolor=#d6d6d6
| 221474 ||  || — || January 25, 2006 || Kitt Peak || Spacewatch || — || align=right | 4.4 km || 
|-id=475 bgcolor=#d6d6d6
| 221475 ||  || — || January 27, 2006 || Anderson Mesa || LONEOS || — || align=right | 4.4 km || 
|-id=476 bgcolor=#d6d6d6
| 221476 ||  || — || January 30, 2006 || Kitt Peak || Spacewatch || — || align=right | 2.9 km || 
|-id=477 bgcolor=#d6d6d6
| 221477 ||  || — || January 30, 2006 || Kitt Peak || Spacewatch || HYG || align=right | 5.9 km || 
|-id=478 bgcolor=#d6d6d6
| 221478 ||  || — || January 31, 2006 || Kitt Peak || Spacewatch || — || align=right | 2.8 km || 
|-id=479 bgcolor=#d6d6d6
| 221479 ||  || — || January 31, 2006 || Kitt Peak || Spacewatch || THM || align=right | 3.0 km || 
|-id=480 bgcolor=#d6d6d6
| 221480 ||  || — || January 31, 2006 || Kitt Peak || Spacewatch || THM || align=right | 2.7 km || 
|-id=481 bgcolor=#d6d6d6
| 221481 ||  || — || January 31, 2006 || Mount Lemmon || Mount Lemmon Survey || — || align=right | 2.8 km || 
|-id=482 bgcolor=#d6d6d6
| 221482 ||  || — || January 31, 2006 || Kitt Peak || Spacewatch || — || align=right | 3.6 km || 
|-id=483 bgcolor=#d6d6d6
| 221483 ||  || — || January 31, 2006 || Kitt Peak || Spacewatch || THM || align=right | 3.4 km || 
|-id=484 bgcolor=#d6d6d6
| 221484 ||  || — || January 31, 2006 || Kitt Peak || Spacewatch || — || align=right | 3.9 km || 
|-id=485 bgcolor=#d6d6d6
| 221485 ||  || — || January 27, 2006 || Anderson Mesa || LONEOS || — || align=right | 5.5 km || 
|-id=486 bgcolor=#d6d6d6
| 221486 ||  || — || January 30, 2006 || Catalina || CSS || — || align=right | 4.5 km || 
|-id=487 bgcolor=#d6d6d6
| 221487 ||  || — || January 23, 2006 || Mount Lemmon || Mount Lemmon Survey || KAR || align=right | 2.0 km || 
|-id=488 bgcolor=#d6d6d6
| 221488 || 2006 CB || — || February 1, 2006 || 7300 Observatory || W. K. Y. Yeung || — || align=right | 4.2 km || 
|-id=489 bgcolor=#d6d6d6
| 221489 ||  || — || February 4, 2006 || 7300 Observatory || W. K. Y. Yeung || THM || align=right | 2.5 km || 
|-id=490 bgcolor=#d6d6d6
| 221490 ||  || — || February 1, 2006 || Kitt Peak || Spacewatch || — || align=right | 3.4 km || 
|-id=491 bgcolor=#d6d6d6
| 221491 ||  || — || February 1, 2006 || Kitt Peak || Spacewatch || — || align=right | 4.3 km || 
|-id=492 bgcolor=#d6d6d6
| 221492 ||  || — || February 1, 2006 || Mount Lemmon || Mount Lemmon Survey || KOR || align=right | 2.2 km || 
|-id=493 bgcolor=#d6d6d6
| 221493 ||  || — || February 2, 2006 || Kitt Peak || Spacewatch || HYG || align=right | 5.0 km || 
|-id=494 bgcolor=#d6d6d6
| 221494 ||  || — || February 3, 2006 || Kitt Peak || Spacewatch || — || align=right | 3.6 km || 
|-id=495 bgcolor=#d6d6d6
| 221495 ||  || — || February 4, 2006 || Kitt Peak || Spacewatch || THM || align=right | 3.2 km || 
|-id=496 bgcolor=#d6d6d6
| 221496 ||  || — || February 3, 2006 || Socorro || LINEAR || — || align=right | 5.0 km || 
|-id=497 bgcolor=#d6d6d6
| 221497 ||  || — || February 20, 2006 || Catalina || CSS || — || align=right | 4.4 km || 
|-id=498 bgcolor=#d6d6d6
| 221498 ||  || — || February 20, 2006 || Catalina || CSS || EMA || align=right | 5.8 km || 
|-id=499 bgcolor=#d6d6d6
| 221499 ||  || — || February 20, 2006 || Socorro || LINEAR || — || align=right | 4.8 km || 
|-id=500 bgcolor=#d6d6d6
| 221500 ||  || — || February 20, 2006 || Kitt Peak || Spacewatch || THM || align=right | 3.2 km || 
|}

221501–221600 

|-bgcolor=#d6d6d6
| 221501 ||  || — || February 20, 2006 || Kitt Peak || Spacewatch || — || align=right | 3.7 km || 
|-id=502 bgcolor=#d6d6d6
| 221502 ||  || — || February 22, 2006 || Anderson Mesa || LONEOS || EOS || align=right | 4.5 km || 
|-id=503 bgcolor=#d6d6d6
| 221503 ||  || — || February 24, 2006 || Kitt Peak || Spacewatch || — || align=right | 2.8 km || 
|-id=504 bgcolor=#d6d6d6
| 221504 ||  || — || February 20, 2006 || Socorro || LINEAR || — || align=right | 4.2 km || 
|-id=505 bgcolor=#d6d6d6
| 221505 ||  || — || February 22, 2006 || Catalina || CSS || — || align=right | 5.4 km || 
|-id=506 bgcolor=#d6d6d6
| 221506 ||  || — || February 22, 2006 || Anderson Mesa || LONEOS || TIR || align=right | 4.8 km || 
|-id=507 bgcolor=#d6d6d6
| 221507 ||  || — || February 25, 2006 || Kitt Peak || Spacewatch || 3:2 || align=right | 6.6 km || 
|-id=508 bgcolor=#d6d6d6
| 221508 ||  || — || February 25, 2006 || Kitt Peak || Spacewatch || — || align=right | 3.5 km || 
|-id=509 bgcolor=#E9E9E9
| 221509 ||  || — || February 25, 2006 || Mount Lemmon || Mount Lemmon Survey || WIT || align=right | 1.6 km || 
|-id=510 bgcolor=#d6d6d6
| 221510 ||  || — || March 2, 2006 || Kitt Peak || Spacewatch || — || align=right | 2.8 km || 
|-id=511 bgcolor=#d6d6d6
| 221511 ||  || — || March 2, 2006 || Kitt Peak || Spacewatch || — || align=right | 3.3 km || 
|-id=512 bgcolor=#d6d6d6
| 221512 ||  || — || March 3, 2006 || Mount Lemmon || Mount Lemmon Survey || — || align=right | 3.2 km || 
|-id=513 bgcolor=#d6d6d6
| 221513 ||  || — || April 7, 2006 || Siding Spring || SSS || — || align=right | 7.7 km || 
|-id=514 bgcolor=#d6d6d6
| 221514 ||  || — || April 19, 2006 || Palomar || NEAT || HYG || align=right | 4.3 km || 
|-id=515 bgcolor=#d6d6d6
| 221515 ||  || — || April 26, 2006 || Kitt Peak || Spacewatch || — || align=right | 3.2 km || 
|-id=516 bgcolor=#fefefe
| 221516 Bergen-Enkheim ||  ||  || August 13, 2006 || Bergen-Enkheim || U. Süßenberger || H || align=right | 1.1 km || 
|-id=517 bgcolor=#fefefe
| 221517 ||  || — || September 14, 2006 || Kitt Peak || Spacewatch || FLO || align=right data-sort-value="0.71" | 710 m || 
|-id=518 bgcolor=#fefefe
| 221518 ||  || — || September 14, 2006 || Kitt Peak || Spacewatch || — || align=right data-sort-value="0.66" | 660 m || 
|-id=519 bgcolor=#fefefe
| 221519 ||  || — || September 15, 2006 || Kitt Peak || Spacewatch || — || align=right data-sort-value="0.76" | 760 m || 
|-id=520 bgcolor=#fefefe
| 221520 ||  || — || September 16, 2006 || Catalina || CSS || — || align=right data-sort-value="0.96" | 960 m || 
|-id=521 bgcolor=#fefefe
| 221521 ||  || — || September 22, 2006 || Anderson Mesa || LONEOS || — || align=right data-sort-value="0.76" | 760 m || 
|-id=522 bgcolor=#fefefe
| 221522 ||  || — || September 20, 2006 || Socorro || LINEAR || — || align=right | 1.1 km || 
|-id=523 bgcolor=#fefefe
| 221523 ||  || — || September 23, 2006 || Kitt Peak || Spacewatch || — || align=right data-sort-value="0.87" | 870 m || 
|-id=524 bgcolor=#fefefe
| 221524 ||  || — || September 25, 2006 || Mount Lemmon || Mount Lemmon Survey || — || align=right | 1.00 km || 
|-id=525 bgcolor=#fefefe
| 221525 ||  || — || September 27, 2006 || Mount Lemmon || Mount Lemmon Survey || FLO || align=right data-sort-value="0.64" | 640 m || 
|-id=526 bgcolor=#fefefe
| 221526 ||  || — || September 30, 2006 || Mount Lemmon || Mount Lemmon Survey || — || align=right | 1.1 km || 
|-id=527 bgcolor=#E9E9E9
| 221527 ||  || — || September 25, 2006 || Mount Lemmon || Mount Lemmon Survey || HNS || align=right | 1.9 km || 
|-id=528 bgcolor=#fefefe
| 221528 ||  || — || October 14, 2006 || Piszkéstető || K. Sárneczky, Z. Kuli || — || align=right data-sort-value="0.72" | 720 m || 
|-id=529 bgcolor=#fefefe
| 221529 ||  || — || October 15, 2006 || Piszkéstető || K. Sárneczky, Z. Kuli || — || align=right | 1.2 km || 
|-id=530 bgcolor=#fefefe
| 221530 ||  || — || October 12, 2006 || Kitt Peak || Spacewatch || FLO || align=right data-sort-value="0.67" | 670 m || 
|-id=531 bgcolor=#fefefe
| 221531 ||  || — || October 12, 2006 || Kitt Peak || Spacewatch || — || align=right | 1.1 km || 
|-id=532 bgcolor=#fefefe
| 221532 ||  || — || October 13, 2006 || Kitt Peak || Spacewatch || FLO || align=right data-sort-value="0.78" | 780 m || 
|-id=533 bgcolor=#fefefe
| 221533 ||  || — || October 11, 2006 || Palomar || NEAT || FLO || align=right data-sort-value="0.80" | 800 m || 
|-id=534 bgcolor=#fefefe
| 221534 ||  || — || October 13, 2006 || Kitt Peak || Spacewatch || FLO || align=right data-sort-value="0.99" | 990 m || 
|-id=535 bgcolor=#fefefe
| 221535 ||  || — || October 13, 2006 || Kitt Peak || Spacewatch || FLO || align=right data-sort-value="0.80" | 800 m || 
|-id=536 bgcolor=#fefefe
| 221536 ||  || — || October 13, 2006 || Kitt Peak || Spacewatch || — || align=right data-sort-value="0.81" | 810 m || 
|-id=537 bgcolor=#fefefe
| 221537 ||  || — || October 13, 2006 || Kitt Peak || Spacewatch || — || align=right data-sort-value="0.90" | 900 m || 
|-id=538 bgcolor=#fefefe
| 221538 ||  || — || October 13, 2006 || Kitt Peak || Spacewatch || — || align=right | 1.3 km || 
|-id=539 bgcolor=#fefefe
| 221539 ||  || — || October 13, 2006 || Kitt Peak || Spacewatch || — || align=right data-sort-value="0.93" | 930 m || 
|-id=540 bgcolor=#fefefe
| 221540 ||  || — || October 1, 2006 || Kitt Peak || Spacewatch || NYSslow || align=right | 1.2 km || 
|-id=541 bgcolor=#fefefe
| 221541 ||  || — || October 18, 2006 || Nyukasa || Mount Nyukasa Stn. || V || align=right data-sort-value="0.89" | 890 m || 
|-id=542 bgcolor=#C2FFFF
| 221542 ||  || — || October 22, 2006 || Mount Lemmon || Mount Lemmon Survey || L4 || align=right | 18 km || 
|-id=543 bgcolor=#fefefe
| 221543 ||  || — || October 16, 2006 || Catalina || CSS || FLO || align=right data-sort-value="0.87" | 870 m || 
|-id=544 bgcolor=#fefefe
| 221544 ||  || — || October 17, 2006 || Kitt Peak || Spacewatch || — || align=right data-sort-value="0.82" | 820 m || 
|-id=545 bgcolor=#fefefe
| 221545 ||  || — || October 17, 2006 || Kitt Peak || Spacewatch || — || align=right | 1.2 km || 
|-id=546 bgcolor=#fefefe
| 221546 ||  || — || October 17, 2006 || Kitt Peak || Spacewatch || — || align=right | 1.2 km || 
|-id=547 bgcolor=#fefefe
| 221547 ||  || — || October 18, 2006 || Kitt Peak || Spacewatch || — || align=right data-sort-value="0.81" | 810 m || 
|-id=548 bgcolor=#fefefe
| 221548 ||  || — || October 19, 2006 || Kitt Peak || Spacewatch || FLO || align=right data-sort-value="0.69" | 690 m || 
|-id=549 bgcolor=#fefefe
| 221549 ||  || — || October 19, 2006 || Kitt Peak || Spacewatch || — || align=right data-sort-value="0.80" | 800 m || 
|-id=550 bgcolor=#fefefe
| 221550 ||  || — || October 19, 2006 || Kitt Peak || Spacewatch || FLO || align=right data-sort-value="0.92" | 920 m || 
|-id=551 bgcolor=#fefefe
| 221551 ||  || — || October 19, 2006 || Catalina || CSS || — || align=right | 1.6 km || 
|-id=552 bgcolor=#fefefe
| 221552 ||  || — || October 20, 2006 || Mount Lemmon || Mount Lemmon Survey || — || align=right data-sort-value="0.98" | 980 m || 
|-id=553 bgcolor=#fefefe
| 221553 ||  || — || October 21, 2006 || Mount Lemmon || Mount Lemmon Survey || FLO || align=right data-sort-value="0.82" | 820 m || 
|-id=554 bgcolor=#fefefe
| 221554 ||  || — || October 19, 2006 || Mount Lemmon || Mount Lemmon Survey || FLO || align=right data-sort-value="0.82" | 820 m || 
|-id=555 bgcolor=#fefefe
| 221555 ||  || — || October 16, 2006 || Catalina || CSS || — || align=right data-sort-value="0.94" | 940 m || 
|-id=556 bgcolor=#fefefe
| 221556 ||  || — || October 16, 2006 || Catalina || CSS || — || align=right | 1.1 km || 
|-id=557 bgcolor=#fefefe
| 221557 ||  || — || October 16, 2006 || Catalina || CSS || — || align=right data-sort-value="0.86" | 860 m || 
|-id=558 bgcolor=#fefefe
| 221558 ||  || — || October 20, 2006 || Mount Lemmon || Mount Lemmon Survey || FLO || align=right data-sort-value="0.71" | 710 m || 
|-id=559 bgcolor=#fefefe
| 221559 ||  || — || October 23, 2006 || Kitt Peak || Spacewatch || — || align=right data-sort-value="0.93" | 930 m || 
|-id=560 bgcolor=#fefefe
| 221560 ||  || — || October 27, 2006 || Catalina || CSS || — || align=right | 1.2 km || 
|-id=561 bgcolor=#fefefe
| 221561 ||  || — || October 28, 2006 || Kitt Peak || Spacewatch || — || align=right data-sort-value="0.89" | 890 m || 
|-id=562 bgcolor=#fefefe
| 221562 ||  || — || October 28, 2006 || Catalina || Mount Lemmon Survey || — || align=right data-sort-value="0.94" | 940 m || 
|-id=563 bgcolor=#fefefe
| 221563 ||  || — || October 28, 2006 || Kitt Peak || Spacewatch || — || align=right | 1.0 km || 
|-id=564 bgcolor=#fefefe
| 221564 ||  || — || October 29, 2006 || Kitt Peak || Spacewatch || — || align=right data-sort-value="0.83" | 830 m || 
|-id=565 bgcolor=#fefefe
| 221565 ||  || — || October 29, 2006 || Catalina || CSS || V || align=right data-sort-value="0.96" | 960 m || 
|-id=566 bgcolor=#fefefe
| 221566 ||  || — || October 20, 2006 || Kitt Peak || M. W. Buie || MAS || align=right | 1.3 km || 
|-id=567 bgcolor=#fefefe
| 221567 ||  || — || October 19, 2006 || Catalina || CSS || — || align=right | 1.2 km || 
|-id=568 bgcolor=#fefefe
| 221568 ||  || — || November 11, 2006 || Kitt Peak || Spacewatch || — || align=right | 1.1 km || 
|-id=569 bgcolor=#fefefe
| 221569 ||  || — || November 9, 2006 || Kitt Peak || Spacewatch || — || align=right data-sort-value="0.89" | 890 m || 
|-id=570 bgcolor=#fefefe
| 221570 ||  || — || November 10, 2006 || Kitt Peak || Spacewatch || V || align=right data-sort-value="0.87" | 870 m || 
|-id=571 bgcolor=#fefefe
| 221571 ||  || — || November 13, 2006 || Kitt Peak || Spacewatch || — || align=right | 1.1 km || 
|-id=572 bgcolor=#FA8072
| 221572 ||  || — || November 10, 2006 || Kitt Peak || Spacewatch || — || align=right | 1.1 km || 
|-id=573 bgcolor=#fefefe
| 221573 ||  || — || November 11, 2006 || Kitt Peak || Spacewatch || — || align=right data-sort-value="0.87" | 870 m || 
|-id=574 bgcolor=#fefefe
| 221574 ||  || — || November 11, 2006 || Kitt Peak || Spacewatch || — || align=right data-sort-value="0.71" | 710 m || 
|-id=575 bgcolor=#fefefe
| 221575 ||  || — || November 11, 2006 || Kitt Peak || Spacewatch || FLO || align=right data-sort-value="0.73" | 730 m || 
|-id=576 bgcolor=#fefefe
| 221576 ||  || — || November 11, 2006 || Catalina || CSS || FLO || align=right data-sort-value="0.83" | 830 m || 
|-id=577 bgcolor=#fefefe
| 221577 ||  || — || November 11, 2006 || MOunt Lemmon || Mount Lemmon Survey || NYS || align=right data-sort-value="0.95" | 950 m || 
|-id=578 bgcolor=#fefefe
| 221578 ||  || — || November 13, 2006 || Kitt Peak || Spacewatch || FLO || align=right data-sort-value="0.77" | 770 m || 
|-id=579 bgcolor=#fefefe
| 221579 ||  || — || November 15, 2006 || Kitt Peak || Spacewatch || V || align=right data-sort-value="0.85" | 850 m || 
|-id=580 bgcolor=#FA8072
| 221580 ||  || — || November 15, 2006 || Socorro || LINEAR || — || align=right data-sort-value="0.85" | 850 m || 
|-id=581 bgcolor=#fefefe
| 221581 ||  || — || November 12, 2006 || Mount Lemmon || Mount Lemmon Survey || — || align=right | 1.3 km || 
|-id=582 bgcolor=#fefefe
| 221582 ||  || — || November 13, 2006 || Mount Lemmon || Mount Lemmon Survey || V || align=right data-sort-value="0.68" | 680 m || 
|-id=583 bgcolor=#fefefe
| 221583 ||  || — || November 13, 2006 || Palomar || NEAT || — || align=right data-sort-value="0.98" | 980 m || 
|-id=584 bgcolor=#fefefe
| 221584 ||  || — || November 15, 2006 || Kitt Peak || Spacewatch || NYS || align=right | 1.0 km || 
|-id=585 bgcolor=#fefefe
| 221585 ||  || — || November 15, 2006 || Catalina || CSS || — || align=right | 1.1 km || 
|-id=586 bgcolor=#fefefe
| 221586 ||  || — || November 14, 2006 || Kitt Peak || Spacewatch || V || align=right data-sort-value="0.97" | 970 m || 
|-id=587 bgcolor=#fefefe
| 221587 ||  || — || November 15, 2006 || Mount Lemmon || Mount Lemmon Survey || FLO || align=right data-sort-value="0.79" | 790 m || 
|-id=588 bgcolor=#fefefe
| 221588 ||  || — || November 15, 2006 || Mount Lemmon || Mount Lemmon Survey || — || align=right | 1.0 km || 
|-id=589 bgcolor=#fefefe
| 221589 ||  || — || November 9, 2006 || Palomar || NEAT || — || align=right data-sort-value="0.72" | 720 m || 
|-id=590 bgcolor=#fefefe
| 221590 ||  || — || November 9, 2006 || Kitt Peak || NEAT || FLO || align=right | 1.0 km || 
|-id=591 bgcolor=#fefefe
| 221591 ||  || — || November 11, 2006 || Kitt Peak || Spacewatch || FLO || align=right data-sort-value="0.66" | 660 m || 
|-id=592 bgcolor=#fefefe
| 221592 ||  || — || November 2, 2006 || Mount Lemmon || Mount Lemmon Survey || — || align=right | 1.3 km || 
|-id=593 bgcolor=#fefefe
| 221593 ||  || — || November 17, 2006 || Mount Lemmon || Mount Lemmon Survey || — || align=right | 1.1 km || 
|-id=594 bgcolor=#fefefe
| 221594 ||  || — || November 18, 2006 || Lulin Observatory || M.-T. Chang, Q.-z. Ye || — || align=right | 1.2 km || 
|-id=595 bgcolor=#fefefe
| 221595 ||  || — || November 16, 2006 || Kitt Peak || Spacewatch || — || align=right | 1.2 km || 
|-id=596 bgcolor=#E9E9E9
| 221596 ||  || — || November 16, 2006 || Kitt Peak || Spacewatch || — || align=right | 2.1 km || 
|-id=597 bgcolor=#fefefe
| 221597 ||  || — || November 16, 2006 || Kitt Peak || Spacewatch || — || align=right data-sort-value="0.99" | 990 m || 
|-id=598 bgcolor=#E9E9E9
| 221598 ||  || — || November 18, 2006 || Kitt Peak || Spacewatch || — || align=right | 1.2 km || 
|-id=599 bgcolor=#fefefe
| 221599 ||  || — || November 19, 2006 || Kitt Peak || Spacewatch || NYS || align=right data-sort-value="0.80" | 800 m || 
|-id=600 bgcolor=#fefefe
| 221600 ||  || — || November 19, 2006 || Socorro || LINEAR || FLO || align=right data-sort-value="0.69" | 690 m || 
|}

221601–221700 

|-bgcolor=#fefefe
| 221601 ||  || — || November 19, 2006 || Socorro || LINEAR || — || align=right | 1.3 km || 
|-id=602 bgcolor=#fefefe
| 221602 ||  || — || November 19, 2006 || Kitt Peak || Spacewatch || — || align=right | 1.3 km || 
|-id=603 bgcolor=#fefefe
| 221603 ||  || — || November 20, 2006 || Kitt Peak || Spacewatch || — || align=right data-sort-value="0.80" | 800 m || 
|-id=604 bgcolor=#fefefe
| 221604 ||  || — || November 21, 2006 || Mount Lemmon || Mount Lemmon Survey || — || align=right | 1.2 km || 
|-id=605 bgcolor=#fefefe
| 221605 ||  || — || November 20, 2006 || Kitt Peak || Spacewatch || — || align=right | 1.3 km || 
|-id=606 bgcolor=#E9E9E9
| 221606 ||  || — || November 22, 2006 || Mount Lemmon || Mount Lemmon Survey || — || align=right | 1.2 km || 
|-id=607 bgcolor=#fefefe
| 221607 ||  || — || November 23, 2006 || Kitt Peak || Spacewatch || MAS || align=right | 1.1 km || 
|-id=608 bgcolor=#fefefe
| 221608 ||  || — || November 17, 2006 || Palomar || NEAT || — || align=right | 1.1 km || 
|-id=609 bgcolor=#E9E9E9
| 221609 ||  || — || November 27, 2006 || Mount Lemmon || Mount Lemmon Survey || — || align=right | 1.0 km || 
|-id=610 bgcolor=#fefefe
| 221610 ||  || — || November 22, 2006 || Mount Lemmon || Mount Lemmon Survey || NYS || align=right data-sort-value="0.82" | 820 m || 
|-id=611 bgcolor=#fefefe
| 221611 ||  || — || December 9, 2006 || Palomar || NEAT || V || align=right data-sort-value="0.97" | 970 m || 
|-id=612 bgcolor=#fefefe
| 221612 ||  || — || December 9, 2006 || Kitt Peak || Spacewatch || NYS || align=right data-sort-value="0.92" | 920 m || 
|-id=613 bgcolor=#fefefe
| 221613 ||  || — || December 11, 2006 || Kitt Peak || Spacewatch || — || align=right | 1.3 km || 
|-id=614 bgcolor=#fefefe
| 221614 ||  || — || December 11, 2006 || Kitt Peak || Spacewatch || — || align=right data-sort-value="0.95" | 950 m || 
|-id=615 bgcolor=#fefefe
| 221615 ||  || — || December 11, 2006 || Kitt Peak || Spacewatch || KLI || align=right | 2.7 km || 
|-id=616 bgcolor=#fefefe
| 221616 ||  || — || December 11, 2006 || Kitt Peak || Spacewatch || — || align=right | 1.3 km || 
|-id=617 bgcolor=#E9E9E9
| 221617 ||  || — || December 12, 2006 || Mount Lemmon || Mount Lemmon Survey || — || align=right | 3.9 km || 
|-id=618 bgcolor=#fefefe
| 221618 ||  || — || December 13, 2006 || Socorro || LINEAR || — || align=right | 1.6 km || 
|-id=619 bgcolor=#fefefe
| 221619 ||  || — || December 13, 2006 || Catalina || CSS || NYS || align=right data-sort-value="0.84" | 840 m || 
|-id=620 bgcolor=#fefefe
| 221620 ||  || — || December 14, 2006 || Socorro || LINEAR || — || align=right | 1.4 km || 
|-id=621 bgcolor=#fefefe
| 221621 ||  || — || December 15, 2006 || Socorro || LINEAR || PHO || align=right | 2.1 km || 
|-id=622 bgcolor=#E9E9E9
| 221622 ||  || — || December 14, 2006 || Kitt Peak || Spacewatch || — || align=right | 3.8 km || 
|-id=623 bgcolor=#fefefe
| 221623 ||  || — || December 15, 2006 || Kitt Peak || Spacewatch || — || align=right | 1.3 km || 
|-id=624 bgcolor=#fefefe
| 221624 ||  || — || December 13, 2006 || Socorro || LINEAR || — || align=right | 1.2 km || 
|-id=625 bgcolor=#fefefe
| 221625 ||  || — || December 13, 2006 || Mount Lemmon || Mount Lemmon Survey || NYS || align=right data-sort-value="0.82" | 820 m || 
|-id=626 bgcolor=#fefefe
| 221626 ||  || — || December 17, 2006 || Mount Lemmon || Mount Lemmon Survey || — || align=right | 1.1 km || 
|-id=627 bgcolor=#fefefe
| 221627 ||  || — || December 20, 2006 || Palomar || NEAT || NYS || align=right data-sort-value="0.88" | 880 m || 
|-id=628 bgcolor=#d6d6d6
| 221628 Hyatt ||  ||  || December 26, 2006 || Catalina || A. R. Gibbs || Tj (2.93) || align=right | 6.9 km || 
|-id=629 bgcolor=#fefefe
| 221629 ||  || — || December 21, 2006 || Mount Lemmon || Mount Lemmon Survey || NYS || align=right data-sort-value="0.86" | 860 m || 
|-id=630 bgcolor=#fefefe
| 221630 ||  || — || December 21, 2006 || Kitt Peak || Spacewatch || V || align=right data-sort-value="0.95" | 950 m || 
|-id=631 bgcolor=#fefefe
| 221631 ||  || — || December 24, 2006 || Catalina || CSS || NYS || align=right data-sort-value="0.81" | 810 m || 
|-id=632 bgcolor=#fefefe
| 221632 ||  || — || December 27, 2006 || Mount Lemmon || Mount Lemmon Survey || NYS || align=right data-sort-value="0.84" | 840 m || 
|-id=633 bgcolor=#fefefe
| 221633 ||  || — || January 8, 2007 || Kitt Peak || Spacewatch || FLO || align=right data-sort-value="0.87" | 870 m || 
|-id=634 bgcolor=#fefefe
| 221634 ||  || — || January 10, 2007 || Kitt Peak || Spacewatch || FLO || align=right | 1.00 km || 
|-id=635 bgcolor=#fefefe
| 221635 ||  || — || January 14, 2007 || Nyukasa || Mount Nyukasa Stn. || FLO || align=right | 1.3 km || 
|-id=636 bgcolor=#fefefe
| 221636 ||  || — || January 15, 2007 || Catalina || CSS || — || align=right | 1.3 km || 
|-id=637 bgcolor=#E9E9E9
| 221637 ||  || — || January 10, 2007 || Mount Lemmon || Mount Lemmon Survey || NEM || align=right | 3.4 km || 
|-id=638 bgcolor=#E9E9E9
| 221638 ||  || — || January 16, 2007 || Socorro || LINEAR || GEF || align=right | 2.0 km || 
|-id=639 bgcolor=#fefefe
| 221639 ||  || — || January 17, 2007 || Kitt Peak || Spacewatch || MAS || align=right | 1.1 km || 
|-id=640 bgcolor=#fefefe
| 221640 ||  || — || January 24, 2007 || Mount Lemmon || Mount Lemmon Survey || MAS || align=right data-sort-value="0.87" | 870 m || 
|-id=641 bgcolor=#fefefe
| 221641 ||  || — || January 24, 2007 || Mount Lemmon || Mount Lemmon Survey || NYS || align=right data-sort-value="0.71" | 710 m || 
|-id=642 bgcolor=#E9E9E9
| 221642 ||  || — || January 26, 2007 || Kitt Peak || Spacewatch || — || align=right | 3.1 km || 
|-id=643 bgcolor=#E9E9E9
| 221643 ||  || — || January 26, 2007 || Kitt Peak || Spacewatch || — || align=right | 2.2 km || 
|-id=644 bgcolor=#fefefe
| 221644 ||  || — || January 24, 2007 || Socorro || LINEAR || — || align=right | 1.5 km || 
|-id=645 bgcolor=#fefefe
| 221645 ||  || — || January 24, 2007 || Catalina || CSS || MAS || align=right | 1.1 km || 
|-id=646 bgcolor=#fefefe
| 221646 ||  || — || January 24, 2007 || Catalina || CSS || NYS || align=right data-sort-value="0.84" | 840 m || 
|-id=647 bgcolor=#E9E9E9
| 221647 ||  || — || January 26, 2007 || Anderson Mesa || LONEOS || MAR || align=right | 2.0 km || 
|-id=648 bgcolor=#E9E9E9
| 221648 ||  || — || January 27, 2007 || Mount Lemmon || Mount Lemmon Survey || — || align=right | 1.1 km || 
|-id=649 bgcolor=#E9E9E9
| 221649 ||  || — || January 17, 2007 || Kitt Peak || Spacewatch || — || align=right | 2.1 km || 
|-id=650 bgcolor=#fefefe
| 221650 ||  || — || January 28, 2007 || Catalina || CSS || — || align=right | 1.4 km || 
|-id=651 bgcolor=#E9E9E9
| 221651 ||  || — || January 28, 2007 || Mount Lemmon || Mount Lemmon Survey || HOF || align=right | 4.0 km || 
|-id=652 bgcolor=#fefefe
| 221652 ||  || — || January 25, 2007 || Kitt Peak || Spacewatch || MAS || align=right data-sort-value="0.78" | 780 m || 
|-id=653 bgcolor=#E9E9E9
| 221653 ||  || — || January 27, 2007 || Kitt Peak || Spacewatch || — || align=right | 2.1 km || 
|-id=654 bgcolor=#E9E9E9
| 221654 || 2007 CZ || — || February 6, 2007 || Kitt Peak || Spacewatch || — || align=right | 2.0 km || 
|-id=655 bgcolor=#d6d6d6
| 221655 ||  || — || February 6, 2007 || Kitt Peak || Spacewatch || EOS || align=right | 2.9 km || 
|-id=656 bgcolor=#fefefe
| 221656 ||  || — || February 6, 2007 || Kitt Peak || Spacewatch || ERI || align=right | 2.2 km || 
|-id=657 bgcolor=#E9E9E9
| 221657 ||  || — || February 6, 2007 || Palomar || NEAT || — || align=right | 1.4 km || 
|-id=658 bgcolor=#E9E9E9
| 221658 ||  || — || February 6, 2007 || Palomar || NEAT || — || align=right | 1.6 km || 
|-id=659 bgcolor=#E9E9E9
| 221659 ||  || — || February 6, 2007 || Mount Lemmon || Mount Lemmon Survey || — || align=right | 3.0 km || 
|-id=660 bgcolor=#d6d6d6
| 221660 ||  || — || February 8, 2007 || Mount Lemmon || Mount Lemmon Survey || — || align=right | 4.3 km || 
|-id=661 bgcolor=#E9E9E9
| 221661 ||  || — || February 6, 2007 || Mount Lemmon || Mount Lemmon Survey || — || align=right | 2.9 km || 
|-id=662 bgcolor=#E9E9E9
| 221662 ||  || — || February 8, 2007 || Kitt Peak || Spacewatch || — || align=right | 3.3 km || 
|-id=663 bgcolor=#fefefe
| 221663 ||  || — || February 7, 2007 || Kitt Peak || Spacewatch || NYS || align=right | 1.0 km || 
|-id=664 bgcolor=#d6d6d6
| 221664 ||  || — || February 7, 2007 || Kitt Peak || Spacewatch || — || align=right | 4.7 km || 
|-id=665 bgcolor=#d6d6d6
| 221665 ||  || — || February 7, 2007 || Mount Lemmon || Mount Lemmon Survey || THM || align=right | 2.5 km || 
|-id=666 bgcolor=#E9E9E9
| 221666 ||  || — || February 7, 2007 || Mount Lemmon || Mount Lemmon Survey || — || align=right | 2.5 km || 
|-id=667 bgcolor=#fefefe
| 221667 ||  || — || February 10, 2007 || Catalina || CSS || NYS || align=right data-sort-value="0.96" | 960 m || 
|-id=668 bgcolor=#fefefe
| 221668 ||  || — || February 8, 2007 || Palomar || NEAT || — || align=right | 1.4 km || 
|-id=669 bgcolor=#E9E9E9
| 221669 ||  || — || February 10, 2007 || Catalina || CSS || GER || align=right | 3.0 km || 
|-id=670 bgcolor=#fefefe
| 221670 ||  || — || February 13, 2007 || Socorro || LINEAR || — || align=right | 2.9 km || 
|-id=671 bgcolor=#d6d6d6
| 221671 ||  || — || February 15, 2007 || Catalina || CSS || — || align=right | 6.3 km || 
|-id=672 bgcolor=#E9E9E9
| 221672 ||  || — || February 15, 2007 || Palomar || NEAT || — || align=right | 3.1 km || 
|-id=673 bgcolor=#E9E9E9
| 221673 || 2007 DP || — || February 17, 2007 || Altschwendt || W. Ries || — || align=right | 2.4 km || 
|-id=674 bgcolor=#FA8072
| 221674 ||  || — || February 16, 2007 || Catalina || CSS || — || align=right | 1.3 km || 
|-id=675 bgcolor=#E9E9E9
| 221675 ||  || — || February 16, 2007 || Mount Lemmon || Mount Lemmon Survey || — || align=right | 1.4 km || 
|-id=676 bgcolor=#E9E9E9
| 221676 ||  || — || February 16, 2007 || Mount Lemmon || Mount Lemmon Survey || HNS || align=right | 2.0 km || 
|-id=677 bgcolor=#E9E9E9
| 221677 ||  || — || February 17, 2007 || Kitt Peak || Spacewatch || — || align=right | 1.5 km || 
|-id=678 bgcolor=#d6d6d6
| 221678 ||  || — || February 17, 2007 || Kitt Peak || Spacewatch || TEL || align=right | 1.8 km || 
|-id=679 bgcolor=#d6d6d6
| 221679 ||  || — || February 17, 2007 || Kitt Peak || Spacewatch || — || align=right | 3.7 km || 
|-id=680 bgcolor=#d6d6d6
| 221680 ||  || — || February 17, 2007 || Kitt Peak || Spacewatch || — || align=right | 3.2 km || 
|-id=681 bgcolor=#E9E9E9
| 221681 ||  || — || February 17, 2007 || Kitt Peak || Spacewatch || — || align=right | 3.6 km || 
|-id=682 bgcolor=#E9E9E9
| 221682 ||  || — || February 17, 2007 || Kitt Peak || Spacewatch || — || align=right | 1.6 km || 
|-id=683 bgcolor=#d6d6d6
| 221683 ||  || — || February 17, 2007 || Kitt Peak || Spacewatch || KOR || align=right | 1.6 km || 
|-id=684 bgcolor=#d6d6d6
| 221684 ||  || — || February 17, 2007 || Kitt Peak || Spacewatch || — || align=right | 3.0 km || 
|-id=685 bgcolor=#d6d6d6
| 221685 ||  || — || February 17, 2007 || Kitt Peak || Spacewatch || NAE || align=right | 2.6 km || 
|-id=686 bgcolor=#d6d6d6
| 221686 ||  || — || February 17, 2007 || Kitt Peak || Spacewatch || — || align=right | 4.3 km || 
|-id=687 bgcolor=#fefefe
| 221687 ||  || — || February 17, 2007 || Kitt Peak || Spacewatch || — || align=right data-sort-value="0.95" | 950 m || 
|-id=688 bgcolor=#d6d6d6
| 221688 ||  || — || February 17, 2007 || Kitt Peak || Spacewatch || — || align=right | 4.4 km || 
|-id=689 bgcolor=#fefefe
| 221689 ||  || — || February 17, 2007 || Catalina || CSS || — || align=right | 1.3 km || 
|-id=690 bgcolor=#E9E9E9
| 221690 ||  || — || February 21, 2007 || Mount Lemmon || Mount Lemmon Survey || — || align=right | 2.4 km || 
|-id=691 bgcolor=#E9E9E9
| 221691 ||  || — || February 16, 2007 || Palomar || NEAT || — || align=right | 2.5 km || 
|-id=692 bgcolor=#E9E9E9
| 221692 ||  || — || February 16, 2007 || Palomar || NEAT || — || align=right | 2.9 km || 
|-id=693 bgcolor=#d6d6d6
| 221693 ||  || — || February 19, 2007 || Mount Lemmon || Mount Lemmon Survey || EOS || align=right | 2.7 km || 
|-id=694 bgcolor=#E9E9E9
| 221694 ||  || — || February 19, 2007 || Mount Lemmon || Mount Lemmon Survey || — || align=right | 3.4 km || 
|-id=695 bgcolor=#E9E9E9
| 221695 ||  || — || February 21, 2007 || Mount Lemmon || Mount Lemmon Survey || — || align=right | 1.4 km || 
|-id=696 bgcolor=#E9E9E9
| 221696 ||  || — || February 22, 2007 || Kitt Peak || Spacewatch || — || align=right | 3.6 km || 
|-id=697 bgcolor=#d6d6d6
| 221697 ||  || — || February 23, 2007 || Socorro || LINEAR || EUP || align=right | 6.1 km || 
|-id=698 bgcolor=#E9E9E9
| 221698 Juliusolsen ||  ||  || February 21, 2007 || Antares || R. Holmes || HOF || align=right | 3.9 km || 
|-id=699 bgcolor=#E9E9E9
| 221699 ||  || — || February 21, 2007 || Kitt Peak || LINEAR || — || align=right | 1.2 km || 
|-id=700 bgcolor=#d6d6d6
| 221700 ||  || — || February 21, 2007 || Kitt Peak || Spacewatch || — || align=right | 4.4 km || 
|}

221701–221800 

|-bgcolor=#d6d6d6
| 221701 ||  || — || February 21, 2007 || Kitt Peak || Spacewatch || — || align=right | 4.9 km || 
|-id=702 bgcolor=#E9E9E9
| 221702 ||  || — || February 23, 2007 || Kitt Peak || Spacewatch || ADE || align=right | 2.4 km || 
|-id=703 bgcolor=#E9E9E9
| 221703 ||  || — || February 23, 2007 || Kitt Peak || Spacewatch || — || align=right | 2.1 km || 
|-id=704 bgcolor=#E9E9E9
| 221704 ||  || — || February 23, 2007 || Mount Lemmon || Mount Lemmon Survey || — || align=right | 1.8 km || 
|-id=705 bgcolor=#E9E9E9
| 221705 ||  || — || February 25, 2007 || Kitt Peak || Spacewatch || HOF || align=right | 3.1 km || 
|-id=706 bgcolor=#d6d6d6
| 221706 ||  || — || February 26, 2007 || Mount Lemmon || Mount Lemmon Survey || THM || align=right | 3.5 km || 
|-id=707 bgcolor=#d6d6d6
| 221707 ||  || — || February 23, 2007 || Mount Lemmon || Mount Lemmon Survey || — || align=right | 2.9 km || 
|-id=708 bgcolor=#E9E9E9
| 221708 ||  || — || February 17, 2007 || Mount Lemmon || Mount Lemmon Survey || — || align=right | 3.5 km || 
|-id=709 bgcolor=#d6d6d6
| 221709 ||  || — || February 17, 2007 || Kitt Peak || Spacewatch || HYG || align=right | 3.6 km || 
|-id=710 bgcolor=#E9E9E9
| 221710 ||  || — || March 9, 2007 || Catalina || CSS || HEN || align=right | 1.4 km || 
|-id=711 bgcolor=#E9E9E9
| 221711 ||  || — || March 9, 2007 || Mount Lemmon || Mount Lemmon Survey || MRX || align=right | 1.2 km || 
|-id=712 bgcolor=#E9E9E9
| 221712 Moleson ||  ||  || March 10, 2007 || Marly || P. Kocher || — || align=right | 1.6 km || 
|-id=713 bgcolor=#E9E9E9
| 221713 ||  || — || March 9, 2007 || Kitt Peak || Spacewatch || — || align=right | 2.4 km || 
|-id=714 bgcolor=#fefefe
| 221714 ||  || — || March 9, 2007 || Mount Lemmon || Mount Lemmon Survey || MAS || align=right data-sort-value="0.78" | 780 m || 
|-id=715 bgcolor=#d6d6d6
| 221715 ||  || — || March 9, 2007 || Mount Lemmon || Mount Lemmon Survey || — || align=right | 4.6 km || 
|-id=716 bgcolor=#d6d6d6
| 221716 ||  || — || March 10, 2007 || Mount Lemmon || Mount Lemmon Survey || KOR || align=right | 1.5 km || 
|-id=717 bgcolor=#d6d6d6
| 221717 ||  || — || March 10, 2007 || Mount Lemmon || Mount Lemmon Survey || — || align=right | 5.6 km || 
|-id=718 bgcolor=#d6d6d6
| 221718 ||  || — || March 10, 2007 || Mount Lemmon || Mount Lemmon Survey || — || align=right | 3.7 km || 
|-id=719 bgcolor=#d6d6d6
| 221719 ||  || — || March 10, 2007 || Mount Lemmon || Mount Lemmon Survey || — || align=right | 4.4 km || 
|-id=720 bgcolor=#d6d6d6
| 221720 ||  || — || March 11, 2007 || Kitt Peak || Spacewatch || EOS || align=right | 3.2 km || 
|-id=721 bgcolor=#E9E9E9
| 221721 ||  || — || March 11, 2007 || Mount Lemmon || Mount Lemmon Survey || — || align=right | 3.2 km || 
|-id=722 bgcolor=#E9E9E9
| 221722 ||  || — || March 9, 2007 || Kitt Peak || Spacewatch || — || align=right | 1.7 km || 
|-id=723 bgcolor=#d6d6d6
| 221723 ||  || — || March 9, 2007 || Kitt Peak || Spacewatch || — || align=right | 4.7 km || 
|-id=724 bgcolor=#fefefe
| 221724 ||  || — || March 9, 2007 || Mount Lemmon || Mount Lemmon Survey || — || align=right | 1.4 km || 
|-id=725 bgcolor=#d6d6d6
| 221725 ||  || — || March 9, 2007 || Kitt Peak || Spacewatch || — || align=right | 5.1 km || 
|-id=726 bgcolor=#d6d6d6
| 221726 ||  || — || March 11, 2007 || Catalina || CSS || HYG || align=right | 4.4 km || 
|-id=727 bgcolor=#E9E9E9
| 221727 ||  || — || March 11, 2007 || Catalina || CSS || — || align=right | 2.5 km || 
|-id=728 bgcolor=#E9E9E9
| 221728 ||  || — || March 11, 2007 || Catalina || CSS || — || align=right | 2.6 km || 
|-id=729 bgcolor=#E9E9E9
| 221729 ||  || — || March 11, 2007 || Mount Lemmon || Mount Lemmon Survey || AGN || align=right | 1.5 km || 
|-id=730 bgcolor=#E9E9E9
| 221730 ||  || — || March 10, 2007 || Mount Lemmon || Mount Lemmon Survey || AGN || align=right | 1.2 km || 
|-id=731 bgcolor=#d6d6d6
| 221731 ||  || — || March 10, 2007 || Kitt Peak || Spacewatch || — || align=right | 2.5 km || 
|-id=732 bgcolor=#d6d6d6
| 221732 ||  || — || March 10, 2007 || Kitt Peak || Spacewatch || — || align=right | 4.8 km || 
|-id=733 bgcolor=#fefefe
| 221733 ||  || — || March 10, 2007 || Kitt Peak || Spacewatch || — || align=right | 1.0 km || 
|-id=734 bgcolor=#d6d6d6
| 221734 ||  || — || March 12, 2007 || Kitt Peak || Spacewatch || — || align=right | 3.6 km || 
|-id=735 bgcolor=#E9E9E9
| 221735 ||  || — || March 11, 2007 || Kitt Peak || Spacewatch || AGN || align=right | 1.9 km || 
|-id=736 bgcolor=#d6d6d6
| 221736 ||  || — || March 11, 2007 || Kitt Peak || Spacewatch || — || align=right | 4.9 km || 
|-id=737 bgcolor=#d6d6d6
| 221737 ||  || — || March 11, 2007 || Kitt Peak || Spacewatch || 7:4 || align=right | 5.3 km || 
|-id=738 bgcolor=#d6d6d6
| 221738 ||  || — || March 12, 2007 || Kitt Peak || Spacewatch || — || align=right | 4.1 km || 
|-id=739 bgcolor=#d6d6d6
| 221739 ||  || — || March 14, 2007 || Mount Lemmon || Mount Lemmon Survey || URS || align=right | 4.6 km || 
|-id=740 bgcolor=#d6d6d6
| 221740 ||  || — || March 9, 2007 || Mount Lemmon || Mount Lemmon Survey || — || align=right | 4.6 km || 
|-id=741 bgcolor=#d6d6d6
| 221741 ||  || — || March 9, 2007 || Mount Lemmon || Mount Lemmon Survey || — || align=right | 3.8 km || 
|-id=742 bgcolor=#E9E9E9
| 221742 ||  || — || March 11, 2007 || Kitt Peak || Spacewatch || — || align=right | 2.7 km || 
|-id=743 bgcolor=#d6d6d6
| 221743 ||  || — || March 12, 2007 || Kitt Peak || Spacewatch || KOR || align=right | 2.1 km || 
|-id=744 bgcolor=#d6d6d6
| 221744 ||  || — || March 12, 2007 || Kitt Peak || Spacewatch || — || align=right | 2.9 km || 
|-id=745 bgcolor=#d6d6d6
| 221745 ||  || — || March 12, 2007 || Mount Lemmon || Mount Lemmon Survey || — || align=right | 4.9 km || 
|-id=746 bgcolor=#d6d6d6
| 221746 ||  || — || March 11, 2007 || Mount Lemmon || Mount Lemmon Survey || 628 || align=right | 2.1 km || 
|-id=747 bgcolor=#d6d6d6
| 221747 ||  || — || March 15, 2007 || Mount Lemmon || Mount Lemmon Survey || MEL || align=right | 5.4 km || 
|-id=748 bgcolor=#d6d6d6
| 221748 ||  || — || March 13, 2007 || Kitt Peak || Spacewatch || — || align=right | 3.3 km || 
|-id=749 bgcolor=#E9E9E9
| 221749 ||  || — || March 15, 2007 || Kitt Peak || Spacewatch || GEF || align=right | 1.9 km || 
|-id=750 bgcolor=#E9E9E9
| 221750 ||  || — || March 15, 2007 || Catalina || CSS || MAR || align=right | 1.6 km || 
|-id=751 bgcolor=#d6d6d6
| 221751 ||  || — || March 9, 2007 || Mount Lemmon || Mount Lemmon Survey || — || align=right | 3.7 km || 
|-id=752 bgcolor=#d6d6d6
| 221752 ||  || — || March 14, 2007 || Kitt Peak || Spacewatch || EOS || align=right | 3.1 km || 
|-id=753 bgcolor=#E9E9E9
| 221753 ||  || — || March 8, 2007 || Palomar || NEAT || MAR || align=right | 1.6 km || 
|-id=754 bgcolor=#d6d6d6
| 221754 ||  || — || March 8, 2007 || Palomar || NEAT || KAR || align=right | 1.6 km || 
|-id=755 bgcolor=#d6d6d6
| 221755 ||  || — || March 13, 2007 || Kitt Peak || Spacewatch || HYG || align=right | 4.6 km || 
|-id=756 bgcolor=#d6d6d6
| 221756 ||  || — || March 10, 2007 || Mount Lemmon || Mount Lemmon Survey || KOR || align=right | 1.6 km || 
|-id=757 bgcolor=#d6d6d6
| 221757 ||  || — || March 16, 2007 || Anderson Mesa || LONEOS || KOR || align=right | 2.3 km || 
|-id=758 bgcolor=#d6d6d6
| 221758 ||  || — || March 19, 2007 || Catalina || CSS || — || align=right | 5.4 km || 
|-id=759 bgcolor=#d6d6d6
| 221759 ||  || — || March 19, 2007 || Catalina || CSS || — || align=right | 5.6 km || 
|-id=760 bgcolor=#d6d6d6
| 221760 ||  || — || March 20, 2007 || Kitt Peak || Spacewatch || — || align=right | 3.8 km || 
|-id=761 bgcolor=#E9E9E9
| 221761 ||  || — || March 20, 2007 || Mount Lemmon || Mount Lemmon Survey || HEN || align=right | 1.5 km || 
|-id=762 bgcolor=#d6d6d6
| 221762 ||  || — || March 20, 2007 || Kitt Peak || Spacewatch || — || align=right | 2.7 km || 
|-id=763 bgcolor=#d6d6d6
| 221763 ||  || — || March 20, 2007 || Mount Lemmon || Mount Lemmon Survey || — || align=right | 3.3 km || 
|-id=764 bgcolor=#d6d6d6
| 221764 ||  || — || March 27, 2007 || Siding Spring || SSS || URS || align=right | 6.0 km || 
|-id=765 bgcolor=#d6d6d6
| 221765 ||  || — || April 14, 2007 || Mount Lemmon || Mount Lemmon Survey || — || align=right | 4.1 km || 
|-id=766 bgcolor=#d6d6d6
| 221766 ||  || — || April 14, 2007 || Mount Lemmon || Mount Lemmon Survey || — || align=right | 4.3 km || 
|-id=767 bgcolor=#d6d6d6
| 221767 ||  || — || April 15, 2007 || Pises || Pises Obs. || — || align=right | 3.5 km || 
|-id=768 bgcolor=#d6d6d6
| 221768 ||  || — || April 13, 2007 || Siding Spring || SSS || — || align=right | 4.5 km || 
|-id=769 bgcolor=#d6d6d6
| 221769 Cima Rest ||  ||  || April 15, 2007 || Magasa || M. Tonincelli, W. Marinello || URS || align=right | 3.9 km || 
|-id=770 bgcolor=#d6d6d6
| 221770 ||  || — || April 15, 2007 || Kitt Peak || Spacewatch || — || align=right | 4.2 km || 
|-id=771 bgcolor=#d6d6d6
| 221771 ||  || — || April 15, 2007 || Kitt Peak || Spacewatch || — || align=right | 4.8 km || 
|-id=772 bgcolor=#d6d6d6
| 221772 ||  || — || April 15, 2007 || Kitt Peak || Spacewatch || — || align=right | 4.4 km || 
|-id=773 bgcolor=#d6d6d6
| 221773 ||  || — || April 15, 2007 || Mount Lemmon || Mount Lemmon Survey || — || align=right | 3.5 km || 
|-id=774 bgcolor=#d6d6d6
| 221774 ||  || — || April 15, 2007 || Kitt Peak || Spacewatch || — || align=right | 3.0 km || 
|-id=775 bgcolor=#d6d6d6
| 221775 ||  || — || April 19, 2007 || 7300 || W. K. Y. Yeung || EOS || align=right | 2.5 km || 
|-id=776 bgcolor=#d6d6d6
| 221776 ||  || — || April 20, 2007 || Kitt Peak || Spacewatch || — || align=right | 4.0 km || 
|-id=777 bgcolor=#E9E9E9
| 221777 ||  || — || April 22, 2007 || Kitt Peak || Spacewatch || RAF || align=right | 1.1 km || 
|-id=778 bgcolor=#d6d6d6
| 221778 ||  || — || May 16, 2007 || Wrightwood || J. W. Young || SHU3:2 || align=right | 8.9 km || 
|-id=779 bgcolor=#d6d6d6
| 221779 ||  || — || June 9, 2007 || Kitt Peak || Spacewatch || — || align=right | 4.8 km || 
|-id=780 bgcolor=#C2FFFF
| 221780 ||  || — || June 21, 2007 || Mount Lemmon || Mount Lemmon Survey || L4 || align=right | 12 km || 
|-id=781 bgcolor=#d6d6d6
| 221781 ||  || — || September 10, 2007 || Mount Lemmon || Mount Lemmon Survey || KAR || align=right | 1.8 km || 
|-id=782 bgcolor=#fefefe
| 221782 ||  || — || September 14, 2007 || Anderson Mesa || LONEOS || NYS || align=right data-sort-value="0.96" | 960 m || 
|-id=783 bgcolor=#E9E9E9
| 221783 ||  || — || October 9, 2007 || Socorro || LINEAR || EUN || align=right | 1.4 km || 
|-id=784 bgcolor=#d6d6d6
| 221784 ||  || — || October 14, 2007 || Anderson Mesa || CSS || EOS || align=right | 3.8 km || 
|-id=785 bgcolor=#C2FFFF
| 221785 ||  || — || November 4, 2007 || Mount Lemmon || Mount Lemmon Survey || L4 || align=right | 9.4 km || 
|-id=786 bgcolor=#C2FFFF
| 221786 ||  || — || November 4, 2007 || Mount Lemmon || Mount Lemmon Survey || L4ERY || align=right | 11 km || 
|-id=787 bgcolor=#FFC2E0
| 221787 ||  || — || November 2, 2007 || Kitt Peak || Spacewatch || AMO || align=right data-sort-value="0.20" | 200 m || 
|-id=788 bgcolor=#fefefe
| 221788 ||  || — || December 30, 2007 || Catalina || CSS || H || align=right | 1.1 km || 
|-id=789 bgcolor=#fefefe
| 221789 ||  || — || January 10, 2008 || Mount Lemmon || Mount Lemmon Survey || NYS || align=right data-sort-value="0.87" | 870 m || 
|-id=790 bgcolor=#fefefe
| 221790 ||  || — || January 11, 2008 || Kitt Peak || Spacewatch || FLO || align=right data-sort-value="0.82" | 820 m || 
|-id=791 bgcolor=#E9E9E9
| 221791 ||  || — || January 10, 2008 || Kitt Peak || Spacewatch || — || align=right | 2.8 km || 
|-id=792 bgcolor=#fefefe
| 221792 ||  || — || January 16, 2008 || Kitt Peak || Spacewatch || FLO || align=right data-sort-value="0.84" | 840 m || 
|-id=793 bgcolor=#fefefe
| 221793 ||  || — || January 30, 2008 || Mount Lemmon || Mount Lemmon Survey || NYS || align=right data-sort-value="0.82" | 820 m || 
|-id=794 bgcolor=#fefefe
| 221794 ||  || — || January 30, 2008 || Kitt Peak || Spacewatch || — || align=right | 1.2 km || 
|-id=795 bgcolor=#fefefe
| 221795 ||  || — || January 30, 2008 || Kitt Peak || Spacewatch || — || align=right | 1.5 km || 
|-id=796 bgcolor=#fefefe
| 221796 ||  || — || January 31, 2008 || Mount Lemmon || Mount Lemmon Survey || — || align=right data-sort-value="0.97" | 970 m || 
|-id=797 bgcolor=#fefefe
| 221797 ||  || — || January 30, 2008 || Mount Lemmon || Mount Lemmon Survey || NYS || align=right data-sort-value="0.88" | 880 m || 
|-id=798 bgcolor=#fefefe
| 221798 ||  || — || February 1, 2008 || Kitt Peak || Spacewatch || — || align=right | 1.6 km || 
|-id=799 bgcolor=#fefefe
| 221799 ||  || — || February 1, 2008 || Kitt Peak || Spacewatch || NYS || align=right | 1.0 km || 
|-id=800 bgcolor=#fefefe
| 221800 ||  || — || February 2, 2008 || Kitt Peak || Spacewatch || MAS || align=right | 1.1 km || 
|}

221801–221900 

|-bgcolor=#fefefe
| 221801 ||  || — || February 8, 2008 || Mount Lemmon || Mount Lemmon Survey || — || align=right data-sort-value="0.73" | 730 m || 
|-id=802 bgcolor=#fefefe
| 221802 ||  || — || February 7, 2008 || Mount Lemmon || Mount Lemmon Survey || FLO || align=right data-sort-value="0.71" | 710 m || 
|-id=803 bgcolor=#fefefe
| 221803 ||  || — || February 7, 2008 || Kitt Peak || Spacewatch || — || align=right | 1.2 km || 
|-id=804 bgcolor=#fefefe
| 221804 ||  || — || February 7, 2008 || Mount Lemmon || Mount Lemmon Survey || — || align=right data-sort-value="0.95" | 950 m || 
|-id=805 bgcolor=#fefefe
| 221805 ||  || — || February 8, 2008 || Kitt Peak || Spacewatch || — || align=right | 1.2 km || 
|-id=806 bgcolor=#fefefe
| 221806 ||  || — || February 9, 2008 || Kitt Peak || Spacewatch || — || align=right data-sort-value="0.93" | 930 m || 
|-id=807 bgcolor=#fefefe
| 221807 ||  || — || February 9, 2008 || Kitt Peak || Spacewatch || FLO || align=right data-sort-value="0.79" | 790 m || 
|-id=808 bgcolor=#fefefe
| 221808 ||  || — || February 13, 2008 || Mount Lemmon || Mount Lemmon Survey || — || align=right data-sort-value="0.99" | 990 m || 
|-id=809 bgcolor=#fefefe
| 221809 ||  || — || February 10, 2008 || Mount Lemmon || Mount Lemmon Survey || V || align=right data-sort-value="0.86" | 860 m || 
|-id=810 bgcolor=#fefefe
| 221810 ||  || — || February 13, 2008 || Mount Lemmon || Mount Lemmon Survey || MAS || align=right data-sort-value="0.96" | 960 m || 
|-id=811 bgcolor=#fefefe
| 221811 ||  || — || February 10, 2008 || Mount Lemmon || Mount Lemmon Survey || — || align=right data-sort-value="0.94" | 940 m || 
|-id=812 bgcolor=#fefefe
| 221812 ||  || — || February 28, 2008 || Catalina || CSS || H || align=right data-sort-value="0.78" | 780 m || 
|-id=813 bgcolor=#fefefe
| 221813 ||  || — || February 27, 2008 || Catalina || CSS || H || align=right data-sort-value="0.99" | 990 m || 
|-id=814 bgcolor=#fefefe
| 221814 ||  || — || February 27, 2008 || Mount Lemmon || Mount Lemmon Survey || — || align=right data-sort-value="0.90" | 900 m || 
|-id=815 bgcolor=#E9E9E9
| 221815 ||  || — || March 3, 2008 || Grove Creek || F. Tozzi || — || align=right | 2.0 km || 
|-id=816 bgcolor=#fefefe
| 221816 ||  || — || March 1, 2008 || Catalina || CSS || H || align=right data-sort-value="0.71" | 710 m || 
|-id=817 bgcolor=#E9E9E9
| 221817 ||  || — || March 1, 2008 || Kitt Peak || Spacewatch || RAF || align=right | 1.0 km || 
|-id=818 bgcolor=#fefefe
| 221818 ||  || — || March 1, 2008 || Kitt Peak || Spacewatch || NYS || align=right data-sort-value="0.96" | 960 m || 
|-id=819 bgcolor=#fefefe
| 221819 ||  || — || March 1, 2008 || Kitt Peak || Spacewatch || — || align=right data-sort-value="0.73" | 730 m || 
|-id=820 bgcolor=#fefefe
| 221820 ||  || — || March 2, 2008 || Kitt Peak || Spacewatch || — || align=right | 1.0 km || 
|-id=821 bgcolor=#E9E9E9
| 221821 ||  || — || March 4, 2008 || Mount Lemmon || Mount Lemmon Survey || JUN || align=right | 1.4 km || 
|-id=822 bgcolor=#fefefe
| 221822 ||  || — || March 3, 2008 || Kitt Peak || Spacewatch || — || align=right data-sort-value="0.95" | 950 m || 
|-id=823 bgcolor=#fefefe
| 221823 ||  || — || March 4, 2008 || Catalina || CSS || — || align=right | 1.7 km || 
|-id=824 bgcolor=#fefefe
| 221824 ||  || — || March 5, 2008 || Mount Lemmon || Mount Lemmon Survey || — || align=right | 1.1 km || 
|-id=825 bgcolor=#E9E9E9
| 221825 ||  || — || March 7, 2008 || Mount Lemmon || Mount Lemmon Survey || INO || align=right | 1.7 km || 
|-id=826 bgcolor=#fefefe
| 221826 ||  || — || March 7, 2008 || Kitt Peak || Spacewatch || — || align=right | 1.2 km || 
|-id=827 bgcolor=#fefefe
| 221827 ||  || — || March 7, 2008 || Kitt Peak || Spacewatch || fast? || align=right | 1.0 km || 
|-id=828 bgcolor=#E9E9E9
| 221828 ||  || — || March 8, 2008 || Kitt Peak || Spacewatch || — || align=right | 2.7 km || 
|-id=829 bgcolor=#fefefe
| 221829 ||  || — || March 7, 2008 || Catalina || CSS || — || align=right | 1.2 km || 
|-id=830 bgcolor=#fefefe
| 221830 ||  || — || March 8, 2008 || Mount Lemmon || Mount Lemmon Survey || NYS || align=right data-sort-value="0.89" | 890 m || 
|-id=831 bgcolor=#fefefe
| 221831 ||  || — || March 9, 2008 || Kitt Peak || Spacewatch || FLO || align=right data-sort-value="0.82" | 820 m || 
|-id=832 bgcolor=#fefefe
| 221832 ||  || — || March 12, 2008 || Kitt Peak || Spacewatch || — || align=right | 1.3 km || 
|-id=833 bgcolor=#fefefe
| 221833 ||  || — || March 8, 2008 || Mount Lemmon || Mount Lemmon Survey || MAS || align=right data-sort-value="0.96" | 960 m || 
|-id=834 bgcolor=#fefefe
| 221834 ||  || — || March 10, 2008 || Kitt Peak || Spacewatch || NYS || align=right data-sort-value="0.86" | 860 m || 
|-id=835 bgcolor=#fefefe
| 221835 ||  || — || March 9, 2008 || Kitt Peak || Spacewatch || — || align=right | 1.4 km || 
|-id=836 bgcolor=#fefefe
| 221836 ||  || — || March 13, 2008 || Kitt Peak || Spacewatch || MAS || align=right data-sort-value="0.98" | 980 m || 
|-id=837 bgcolor=#fefefe
| 221837 ||  || — || March 25, 2008 || Kitt Peak || Spacewatch || — || align=right | 1.2 km || 
|-id=838 bgcolor=#fefefe
| 221838 ||  || — || March 27, 2008 || Mount Lemmon || Mount Lemmon Survey || NYS || align=right data-sort-value="0.93" | 930 m || 
|-id=839 bgcolor=#fefefe
| 221839 ||  || — || March 27, 2008 || Kitt Peak || Spacewatch || — || align=right data-sort-value="0.98" | 980 m || 
|-id=840 bgcolor=#fefefe
| 221840 ||  || — || March 28, 2008 || Kitt Peak || Spacewatch || NYS || align=right data-sort-value="0.83" | 830 m || 
|-id=841 bgcolor=#fefefe
| 221841 ||  || — || March 28, 2008 || Mount Lemmon || Mount Lemmon Survey || MAS || align=right data-sort-value="0.75" | 750 m || 
|-id=842 bgcolor=#fefefe
| 221842 ||  || — || March 26, 2008 || Mount Lemmon || Mount Lemmon Survey || — || align=right | 1.3 km || 
|-id=843 bgcolor=#fefefe
| 221843 ||  || — || March 28, 2008 || Mount Lemmon || Mount Lemmon Survey || NYS || align=right data-sort-value="0.75" | 750 m || 
|-id=844 bgcolor=#fefefe
| 221844 ||  || — || March 28, 2008 || Kitt Peak || Spacewatch || — || align=right | 1.2 km || 
|-id=845 bgcolor=#E9E9E9
| 221845 ||  || — || March 29, 2008 || Kitt Peak || Spacewatch || MAR || align=right | 1.3 km || 
|-id=846 bgcolor=#fefefe
| 221846 ||  || — || March 27, 2008 || Mount Lemmon || Mount Lemmon Survey || — || align=right | 1.0 km || 
|-id=847 bgcolor=#E9E9E9
| 221847 ||  || — || March 28, 2008 || Kitt Peak || Spacewatch || MIS || align=right | 4.1 km || 
|-id=848 bgcolor=#d6d6d6
| 221848 ||  || — || March 30, 2008 || Kitt Peak || Spacewatch || — || align=right | 4.3 km || 
|-id=849 bgcolor=#d6d6d6
| 221849 ||  || — || March 31, 2008 || Mount Lemmon || Mount Lemmon Survey || — || align=right | 2.8 km || 
|-id=850 bgcolor=#fefefe
| 221850 ||  || — || March 31, 2008 || Mount Lemmon || Mount Lemmon Survey || — || align=right | 1.0 km || 
|-id=851 bgcolor=#d6d6d6
| 221851 ||  || — || March 30, 2008 || Kitt Peak || Spacewatch || LIX || align=right | 6.1 km || 
|-id=852 bgcolor=#fefefe
| 221852 ||  || — || March 28, 2008 || Kitt Peak || Spacewatch || — || align=right | 1.0 km || 
|-id=853 bgcolor=#E9E9E9
| 221853 || 2008 GB || — || April 1, 2008 || Piszkéstető || K. Sárneczky || — || align=right | 2.3 km || 
|-id=854 bgcolor=#E9E9E9
| 221854 || 2008 GW || — || April 2, 2008 || Farra d'Isonzo || Farra d'Isonzo || — || align=right | 1.2 km || 
|-id=855 bgcolor=#E9E9E9
| 221855 ||  || — || April 1, 2008 || Kitt Peak || Spacewatch || — || align=right | 1.3 km || 
|-id=856 bgcolor=#fefefe
| 221856 ||  || — || April 1, 2008 || Kitt Peak || Spacewatch || MAS || align=right | 1.2 km || 
|-id=857 bgcolor=#E9E9E9
| 221857 ||  || — || April 1, 2008 || Kitt Peak || Spacewatch || — || align=right | 1.6 km || 
|-id=858 bgcolor=#d6d6d6
| 221858 ||  || — || April 1, 2008 || Kitt Peak || Spacewatch || — || align=right | 4.1 km || 
|-id=859 bgcolor=#fefefe
| 221859 ||  || — || April 11, 2008 || Catalina || CSS || — || align=right | 1.7 km || 
|-id=860 bgcolor=#E9E9E9
| 221860 ||  || — || April 1, 2008 || Mount Lemmon || Mount Lemmon Survey || — || align=right | 2.4 km || 
|-id=861 bgcolor=#E9E9E9
| 221861 ||  || — || April 5, 2008 || Kitt Peak || Spacewatch || — || align=right | 1.2 km || 
|-id=862 bgcolor=#fefefe
| 221862 ||  || — || April 6, 2008 || Kitt Peak || Spacewatch || MAS || align=right | 1.0 km || 
|-id=863 bgcolor=#E9E9E9
| 221863 ||  || — || April 6, 2008 || Mount Lemmon || Mount Lemmon Survey || — || align=right | 1.2 km || 
|-id=864 bgcolor=#E9E9E9
| 221864 ||  || — || April 7, 2008 || Kitt Peak || Spacewatch || — || align=right | 2.1 km || 
|-id=865 bgcolor=#fefefe
| 221865 ||  || — || April 7, 2008 || Kitt Peak || Spacewatch || MAS || align=right data-sort-value="0.85" | 850 m || 
|-id=866 bgcolor=#fefefe
| 221866 ||  || — || April 7, 2008 || Kitt Peak || Spacewatch || — || align=right | 1.2 km || 
|-id=867 bgcolor=#fefefe
| 221867 ||  || — || April 6, 2008 || Mount Lemmon || Mount Lemmon Survey || EUT || align=right data-sort-value="0.94" | 940 m || 
|-id=868 bgcolor=#fefefe
| 221868 ||  || — || April 7, 2008 || Kitt Peak || Spacewatch || EUT || align=right | 2.8 km || 
|-id=869 bgcolor=#fefefe
| 221869 ||  || — || April 11, 2008 || Kitt Peak || Spacewatch || — || align=right data-sort-value="0.84" | 840 m || 
|-id=870 bgcolor=#fefefe
| 221870 ||  || — || April 13, 2008 || Kitt Peak || Spacewatch || — || align=right | 1.2 km || 
|-id=871 bgcolor=#d6d6d6
| 221871 ||  || — || April 14, 2008 || Mount Lemmon || Mount Lemmon Survey || — || align=right | 4.7 km || 
|-id=872 bgcolor=#fefefe
| 221872 ||  || — || April 6, 2008 || Kitt Peak || Spacewatch || — || align=right | 1.1 km || 
|-id=873 bgcolor=#d6d6d6
| 221873 ||  || — || April 6, 2008 || Mount Lemmon || Mount Lemmon Survey || — || align=right | 3.1 km || 
|-id=874 bgcolor=#E9E9E9
| 221874 ||  || — || April 7, 2008 || Kitt Peak || Spacewatch || — || align=right | 1.1 km || 
|-id=875 bgcolor=#fefefe
| 221875 ||  || — || April 24, 2008 || Kitt Peak || Spacewatch || V || align=right data-sort-value="0.77" | 770 m || 
|-id=876 bgcolor=#fefefe
| 221876 ||  || — || April 24, 2008 || Catalina || CSS || V || align=right data-sort-value="0.96" | 960 m || 
|-id=877 bgcolor=#d6d6d6
| 221877 ||  || — || April 25, 2008 || Kitt Peak || Spacewatch || — || align=right | 3.4 km || 
|-id=878 bgcolor=#E9E9E9
| 221878 ||  || — || April 25, 2008 || Kitt Peak || Spacewatch || — || align=right | 1.8 km || 
|-id=879 bgcolor=#d6d6d6
| 221879 ||  || — || April 26, 2008 || Kitt Peak || Spacewatch || — || align=right | 3.6 km || 
|-id=880 bgcolor=#d6d6d6
| 221880 ||  || — || April 29, 2008 || Mount Lemmon || Mount Lemmon Survey || — || align=right | 4.5 km || 
|-id=881 bgcolor=#E9E9E9
| 221881 ||  || — || April 29, 2008 || La Sagra || OAM Obs. || — || align=right | 2.3 km || 
|-id=882 bgcolor=#E9E9E9
| 221882 ||  || — || April 26, 2008 || Mount Lemmon || Mount Lemmon Survey || RAF || align=right data-sort-value="0.93" | 930 m || 
|-id=883 bgcolor=#fefefe
| 221883 ||  || — || April 28, 2008 || Kitt Peak || Spacewatch || — || align=right data-sort-value="0.98" | 980 m || 
|-id=884 bgcolor=#fefefe
| 221884 ||  || — || April 28, 2008 || Kitt Peak || Spacewatch || FLO || align=right data-sort-value="0.92" | 920 m || 
|-id=885 bgcolor=#d6d6d6
| 221885 ||  || — || April 29, 2008 || Kitt Peak || Spacewatch || THM || align=right | 2.9 km || 
|-id=886 bgcolor=#E9E9E9
| 221886 ||  || — || April 30, 2008 || Mount Lemmon || Mount Lemmon Survey || — || align=right | 2.3 km || 
|-id=887 bgcolor=#E9E9E9
| 221887 ||  || — || April 30, 2008 || Catalina || CSS || — || align=right | 3.3 km || 
|-id=888 bgcolor=#fefefe
| 221888 ||  || — || April 26, 2008 || Mount Lemmon || Mount Lemmon Survey || — || align=right | 1.6 km || 
|-id=889 bgcolor=#fefefe
| 221889 ||  || — || May 3, 2008 || Mount Lemmon || Mount Lemmon Survey || — || align=right | 1.8 km || 
|-id=890 bgcolor=#fefefe
| 221890 ||  || — || May 3, 2008 || Kitt Peak || Spacewatch || — || align=right data-sort-value="0.96" | 960 m || 
|-id=891 bgcolor=#fefefe
| 221891 ||  || — || May 5, 2008 || Jarnac || Jarnac Obs. || NYS || align=right data-sort-value="0.72" | 720 m || 
|-id=892 bgcolor=#d6d6d6
| 221892 ||  || — || May 4, 2008 || Kitt Peak || Spacewatch || URS || align=right | 3.8 km || 
|-id=893 bgcolor=#d6d6d6
| 221893 ||  || — || May 5, 2008 || Bisei SG Center || BATTeRS || 7:4 || align=right | 6.5 km || 
|-id=894 bgcolor=#E9E9E9
| 221894 ||  || — || May 12, 2008 || Grove Creek || F. Tozzi || — || align=right | 1.6 km || 
|-id=895 bgcolor=#E9E9E9
| 221895 ||  || — || May 3, 2008 || Mount Lemmon || Mount Lemmon Survey || — || align=right | 1.6 km || 
|-id=896 bgcolor=#E9E9E9
| 221896 ||  || — || May 27, 2008 || Kitt Peak || Spacewatch || — || align=right | 1.3 km || 
|-id=897 bgcolor=#d6d6d6
| 221897 ||  || — || May 29, 2008 || Mount Lemmon || Mount Lemmon Survey || — || align=right | 3.7 km || 
|-id=898 bgcolor=#d6d6d6
| 221898 ||  || — || May 27, 2008 || Kitt Peak || Spacewatch || THM || align=right | 2.7 km || 
|-id=899 bgcolor=#d6d6d6
| 221899 ||  || — || May 27, 2008 || Kitt Peak || Spacewatch || — || align=right | 3.1 km || 
|-id=900 bgcolor=#E9E9E9
| 221900 ||  || — || May 29, 2008 || Kitt Peak || Spacewatch || — || align=right | 2.6 km || 
|}

221901–222000 

|-bgcolor=#fefefe
| 221901 ||  || — || May 29, 2008 || Mount Lemmon || Mount Lemmon Survey || V || align=right | 1.0 km || 
|-id=902 bgcolor=#E9E9E9
| 221902 ||  || — || May 30, 2008 || Kitt Peak || Spacewatch || — || align=right | 1.4 km || 
|-id=903 bgcolor=#E9E9E9
| 221903 ||  || — || May 30, 2008 || Kitt Peak || Spacewatch || — || align=right | 4.5 km || 
|-id=904 bgcolor=#d6d6d6
| 221904 ||  || — || May 31, 2008 || Kitt Peak || Spacewatch || — || align=right | 4.6 km || 
|-id=905 bgcolor=#fefefe
| 221905 ||  || — || June 4, 2008 || Kitt Peak || Spacewatch || FLO || align=right | 1.3 km || 
|-id=906 bgcolor=#d6d6d6
| 221906 ||  || — || June 4, 2008 || Kitt Peak || Spacewatch || LIX || align=right | 5.4 km || 
|-id=907 bgcolor=#d6d6d6
| 221907 ||  || — || June 6, 2008 || Kitt Peak || Spacewatch || KOR || align=right | 1.5 km || 
|-id=908 bgcolor=#C2FFFF
| 221908 Agastrophus ||  ||  || August 21, 2008 || Marly || P. Kocher || L4 || align=right | 15 km || 
|-id=909 bgcolor=#C2FFFF
| 221909 ||  || — || August 24, 2008 || Pla D'Arguines || R. Ferrando || L4 || align=right | 12 km || 
|-id=910 bgcolor=#C2FFFF
| 221910 ||  || — || August 31, 2008 || Hibiscus || S. F. Hönig, N. Teamo || L4 || align=right | 17 km || 
|-id=911 bgcolor=#C2FFFF
| 221911 ||  || — || August 27, 2008 || La Sagra || OAM Obs. || L4 || align=right | 14 km || 
|-id=912 bgcolor=#C2FFFF
| 221912 ||  || — || September 5, 2008 || Needville || J. Dellinger, C. Sexton || L4 || align=right | 12 km || 
|-id=913 bgcolor=#C2FFFF
| 221913 ||  || — || September 2, 2008 || Kitt Peak || Spacewatch || L4 || align=right | 10 km || 
|-id=914 bgcolor=#C2FFFF
| 221914 ||  || — || September 2, 2008 || Kitt Peak || Spacewatch || L4 || align=right | 9.9 km || 
|-id=915 bgcolor=#C2FFFF
| 221915 ||  || — || September 22, 2008 || Socorro || LINEAR || L4 || align=right | 14 km || 
|-id=916 bgcolor=#C2FFFF
| 221916 ||  || — || September 23, 2008 || Marly || P. Kocher || L4 || align=right | 10 km || 
|-id=917 bgcolor=#C2FFFF
| 221917 Opites ||  ||  || September 26, 2008 || Taunus || S. Karge, E. Schwab || L4 || align=right | 15 km || 
|-id=918 bgcolor=#d6d6d6
| 221918 ||  || — || October 20, 2008 || Kitt Peak || Spacewatch || — || align=right | 3.2 km || 
|-id=919 bgcolor=#E9E9E9
| 221919 ||  || — || November 25, 2008 || Farra d'Isonzo || Farra d'Isonzo || — || align=right | 2.2 km || 
|-id=920 bgcolor=#E9E9E9
| 221920 ||  || — || May 23, 2009 || Catalina || CSS || — || align=right | 1.7 km || 
|-id=921 bgcolor=#d6d6d6
| 221921 ||  || — || June 17, 2009 || Kitt Peak || Spacewatch || EOS || align=right | 2.5 km || 
|-id=922 bgcolor=#fefefe
| 221922 || 2009 OJ || — || July 16, 2009 || La Sagra || OAM Obs. || — || align=right | 1.6 km || 
|-id=923 bgcolor=#fefefe
| 221923 Jayeff ||  ||  || July 22, 2009 || Moorook || N. Falla || — || align=right | 1.1 km || 
|-id=924 bgcolor=#fefefe
| 221924 ||  || — || July 23, 2009 || Tiki || N. Teamo || — || align=right data-sort-value="0.99" | 990 m || 
|-id=925 bgcolor=#fefefe
| 221925 ||  || — || July 26, 2009 || La Sagra || OAM Obs. || — || align=right | 1.2 km || 
|-id=926 bgcolor=#fefefe
| 221926 ||  || — || July 28, 2009 || La Sagra || OAM Obs. || V || align=right data-sort-value="0.68" | 680 m || 
|-id=927 bgcolor=#fefefe
| 221927 ||  || — || July 27, 2009 || La Sagra || OAM Obs. || — || align=right | 1.4 km || 
|-id=928 bgcolor=#d6d6d6
| 221928 ||  || — || July 27, 2009 || Kitt Peak || Spacewatch || — || align=right | 4.0 km || 
|-id=929 bgcolor=#E9E9E9
| 221929 ||  || — || July 27, 2009 || Kitt Peak || Spacewatch || HEN || align=right | 1.4 km || 
|-id=930 bgcolor=#fefefe
| 221930 ||  || — || July 29, 2009 || Tiki || N. Teamo || CLA || align=right | 2.0 km || 
|-id=931 bgcolor=#fefefe
| 221931 ||  || — || July 28, 2009 || Kitt Peak || Spacewatch || — || align=right data-sort-value="0.84" | 840 m || 
|-id=932 bgcolor=#fefefe
| 221932 ||  || — || July 28, 2009 || Kitt Peak || Spacewatch || NYS || align=right data-sort-value="0.87" | 870 m || 
|-id=933 bgcolor=#fefefe
| 221933 || 2009 PE || — || August 1, 2009 || Hibiscus || N. Teamo || — || align=right data-sort-value="0.76" | 760 m || 
|-id=934 bgcolor=#fefefe
| 221934 ||  || — || August 14, 2009 || Dauban || F. Kugel || — || align=right | 1.2 km || 
|-id=935 bgcolor=#d6d6d6
| 221935 ||  || — || August 17, 2009 || Črni Vrh || Črni Vrh || THB || align=right | 3.7 km || 
|-id=936 bgcolor=#fefefe
| 221936 ||  || — || August 29, 2009 || La Sagra || OAM Obs. || — || align=right data-sort-value="0.99" | 990 m || 
|-id=937 bgcolor=#E9E9E9
| 221937 || 2066 P-L || — || September 24, 1960 || Palomar || PLS || — || align=right | 2.1 km || 
|-id=938 bgcolor=#E9E9E9
| 221938 || 3019 P-L || — || September 24, 1960 || Palomar || PLS || — || align=right | 4.6 km || 
|-id=939 bgcolor=#E9E9E9
| 221939 || 6017 P-L || — || September 24, 1960 || Palomar || PLS || — || align=right | 1.2 km || 
|-id=940 bgcolor=#fefefe
| 221940 || 6508 P-L || — || September 24, 1960 || Palomar || PLS || — || align=right data-sort-value="0.97" | 970 m || 
|-id=941 bgcolor=#fefefe
| 221941 || 1146 T-2 || — || September 29, 1973 || Palomar || PLS || — || align=right | 1.1 km || 
|-id=942 bgcolor=#fefefe
| 221942 || 1543 T-2 || — || September 29, 1973 || Palomar || PLS || NYS || align=right data-sort-value="0.90" | 900 m || 
|-id=943 bgcolor=#fefefe
| 221943 || 1190 T-3 || — || October 17, 1977 || Palomar || PLS || — || align=right | 1.3 km || 
|-id=944 bgcolor=#d6d6d6
| 221944 || 2339 T-3 || — || October 16, 1977 || Palomar || PLS || — || align=right | 3.9 km || 
|-id=945 bgcolor=#E9E9E9
| 221945 || 3227 T-3 || — || October 16, 1977 || Palomar || PLS || — || align=right | 3.7 km || 
|-id=946 bgcolor=#fefefe
| 221946 ||  || — || May 21, 1990 || Kitt Peak || Spacewatch || H || align=right data-sort-value="0.96" | 960 m || 
|-id=947 bgcolor=#fefefe
| 221947 ||  || — || February 29, 1992 || La Silla || UESAC || — || align=right | 2.7 km || 
|-id=948 bgcolor=#E9E9E9
| 221948 ||  || — || March 19, 1993 || La Silla || UESAC || HOF || align=right | 4.5 km || 
|-id=949 bgcolor=#d6d6d6
| 221949 ||  || — || September 22, 1993 || La Silla || H. Debehogne, E. W. Elst || — || align=right | 5.0 km || 
|-id=950 bgcolor=#d6d6d6
| 221950 ||  || — || October 9, 1993 || La Silla || E. W. Elst || EMA || align=right | 5.6 km || 
|-id=951 bgcolor=#d6d6d6
| 221951 ||  || — || October 9, 1993 || La Silla || E. W. Elst || — || align=right | 4.0 km || 
|-id=952 bgcolor=#fefefe
| 221952 ||  || — || August 10, 1994 || La Silla || E. W. Elst || — || align=right | 1.2 km || 
|-id=953 bgcolor=#fefefe
| 221953 ||  || — || October 10, 1994 || Kitt Peak || Spacewatch || — || align=right | 1.5 km || 
|-id=954 bgcolor=#fefefe
| 221954 ||  || — || November 5, 1994 || Kitt Peak || Spacewatch || — || align=right | 1.1 km || 
|-id=955 bgcolor=#fefefe
| 221955 ||  || — || February 2, 1995 || Kitt Peak || Spacewatch || — || align=right data-sort-value="0.84" | 840 m || 
|-id=956 bgcolor=#d6d6d6
| 221956 ||  || — || March 23, 1995 || Kitt Peak || Spacewatch || EOS || align=right | 3.6 km || 
|-id=957 bgcolor=#d6d6d6
| 221957 ||  || — || March 31, 1995 || Kitt Peak || Spacewatch || — || align=right | 3.4 km || 
|-id=958 bgcolor=#fefefe
| 221958 ||  || — || June 28, 1995 || Kitt Peak || Spacewatch || — || align=right | 1.1 km || 
|-id=959 bgcolor=#E9E9E9
| 221959 ||  || — || July 26, 1995 || Kitt Peak || Spacewatch || — || align=right | 2.4 km || 
|-id=960 bgcolor=#E9E9E9
| 221960 ||  || — || September 17, 1995 || Kitt Peak || Spacewatch || HEN || align=right | 1.4 km || 
|-id=961 bgcolor=#fefefe
| 221961 ||  || — || September 19, 1995 || Kitt Peak || Spacewatch || — || align=right | 1.1 km || 
|-id=962 bgcolor=#fefefe
| 221962 ||  || — || September 21, 1995 || Kitt Peak || Spacewatch || — || align=right | 1.0 km || 
|-id=963 bgcolor=#FA8072
| 221963 ||  || — || September 23, 1995 || Kitt Peak || Spacewatch || — || align=right data-sort-value="0.74" | 740 m || 
|-id=964 bgcolor=#fefefe
| 221964 ||  || — || September 24, 1995 || Kitt Peak || Spacewatch || — || align=right data-sort-value="0.87" | 870 m || 
|-id=965 bgcolor=#E9E9E9
| 221965 ||  || — || September 24, 1995 || Kitt Peak || Spacewatch || WIT || align=right | 1.4 km || 
|-id=966 bgcolor=#fefefe
| 221966 ||  || — || September 25, 1995 || Kitt Peak || Spacewatch || — || align=right data-sort-value="0.81" | 810 m || 
|-id=967 bgcolor=#E9E9E9
| 221967 ||  || — || September 25, 1995 || Kitt Peak || Spacewatch || DOR || align=right | 2.9 km || 
|-id=968 bgcolor=#E9E9E9
| 221968 ||  || — || September 19, 1995 || Kitt Peak || Spacewatch || — || align=right | 3.4 km || 
|-id=969 bgcolor=#E9E9E9
| 221969 ||  || — || October 19, 1995 || Kitt Peak || Spacewatch || — || align=right | 2.7 km || 
|-id=970 bgcolor=#E9E9E9
| 221970 ||  || — || October 19, 1995 || Kitt Peak || Spacewatch || AGN || align=right | 1.4 km || 
|-id=971 bgcolor=#fefefe
| 221971 ||  || — || October 19, 1995 || Kitt Peak || Spacewatch || NYS || align=right data-sort-value="0.77" | 770 m || 
|-id=972 bgcolor=#E9E9E9
| 221972 ||  || — || October 19, 1995 || Kitt Peak || Spacewatch || — || align=right | 2.4 km || 
|-id=973 bgcolor=#fefefe
| 221973 ||  || — || October 22, 1995 || Kitt Peak || Spacewatch || NYS || align=right | 2.4 km || 
|-id=974 bgcolor=#E9E9E9
| 221974 ||  || — || November 14, 1995 || Kitt Peak || Spacewatch || HOF || align=right | 3.6 km || 
|-id=975 bgcolor=#fefefe
| 221975 ||  || — || November 14, 1995 || Kitt Peak || Spacewatch || FLO || align=right | 2.0 km || 
|-id=976 bgcolor=#E9E9E9
| 221976 ||  || — || November 15, 1995 || Kitt Peak || Spacewatch || NEM || align=right | 2.8 km || 
|-id=977 bgcolor=#E9E9E9
| 221977 ||  || — || November 16, 1995 || Kuma Kogen || A. Nakamura || — || align=right | 2.2 km || 
|-id=978 bgcolor=#fefefe
| 221978 ||  || — || November 17, 1995 || Kitt Peak || Spacewatch || FLO || align=right data-sort-value="0.84" | 840 m || 
|-id=979 bgcolor=#fefefe
| 221979 ||  || — || November 18, 1995 || Kitt Peak || Spacewatch || — || align=right data-sort-value="0.86" | 860 m || 
|-id=980 bgcolor=#FFC2E0
| 221980 || 1996 EO || — || March 15, 1996 || Haleakala || NEAT || APOPHAcritical || align=right data-sort-value="0.43" | 430 m || 
|-id=981 bgcolor=#d6d6d6
| 221981 ||  || — || March 11, 1996 || Kitt Peak || Spacewatch || EUP || align=right | 4.4 km || 
|-id=982 bgcolor=#d6d6d6
| 221982 ||  || — || April 11, 1996 || Kitt Peak || Spacewatch || SHU3:2 || align=right | 8.1 km || 
|-id=983 bgcolor=#E9E9E9
| 221983 ||  || — || August 12, 1996 || Rand || G. R. Viscome || — || align=right | 1.8 km || 
|-id=984 bgcolor=#E9E9E9
| 221984 ||  || — || December 8, 1996 || Kitt Peak || Spacewatch || — || align=right | 2.6 km || 
|-id=985 bgcolor=#fefefe
| 221985 ||  || — || January 31, 1997 || Prescott || P. G. Comba || FLO || align=right | 1.1 km || 
|-id=986 bgcolor=#E9E9E9
| 221986 ||  || — || February 2, 1997 || Kitt Peak || Spacewatch || — || align=right | 3.4 km || 
|-id=987 bgcolor=#E9E9E9
| 221987 ||  || — || February 3, 1997 || Kitt Peak || Spacewatch || MRX || align=right | 1.6 km || 
|-id=988 bgcolor=#fefefe
| 221988 ||  || — || March 5, 1997 || Kitt Peak || Spacewatch || — || align=right | 1.2 km || 
|-id=989 bgcolor=#fefefe
| 221989 ||  || — || April 7, 1997 || Kitt Peak || Spacewatch || — || align=right | 1.2 km || 
|-id=990 bgcolor=#fefefe
| 221990 ||  || — || April 3, 1997 || Socorro || LINEAR || NYS || align=right | 1.0 km || 
|-id=991 bgcolor=#fefefe
| 221991 ||  || — || April 6, 1997 || Socorro || LINEAR || FLO || align=right | 1.1 km || 
|-id=992 bgcolor=#d6d6d6
| 221992 ||  || — || June 8, 1997 || Kitt Peak || Spacewatch || EOS || align=right | 2.7 km || 
|-id=993 bgcolor=#d6d6d6
| 221993 ||  || — || June 27, 1997 || Kitt Peak || Spacewatch || — || align=right | 4.7 km || 
|-id=994 bgcolor=#fefefe
| 221994 ||  || — || August 11, 1997 || Majorca || Á. López J., R. Pacheco || — || align=right | 1.6 km || 
|-id=995 bgcolor=#C2FFFF
| 221995 ||  || — || October 4, 1997 || Kitt Peak || Spacewatch || L4 || align=right | 10 km || 
|-id=996 bgcolor=#E9E9E9
| 221996 ||  || — || December 19, 1997 || Xinglong || SCAP || — || align=right | 3.0 km || 
|-id=997 bgcolor=#E9E9E9
| 221997 ||  || — || January 1, 1998 || Kitt Peak || Spacewatch || EUN || align=right | 2.2 km || 
|-id=998 bgcolor=#E9E9E9
| 221998 ||  || — || February 28, 1998 || Kitt Peak || Spacewatch || — || align=right | 2.0 km || 
|-id=999 bgcolor=#E9E9E9
| 221999 ||  || — || March 3, 1998 || La Silla || E. W. Elst || — || align=right | 4.4 km || 
|-id=000 bgcolor=#E9E9E9
| 222000 ||  || — || March 28, 1998 || Socorro || LINEAR || INO || align=right | 1.7 km || 
|}

References

External links 
 Discovery Circumstances: Numbered Minor Planets (220001)–(225000) (IAU Minor Planet Center)

0221